= Kalslagen en Bilderdam =

Coordinates: 52°14′N 4°44′E

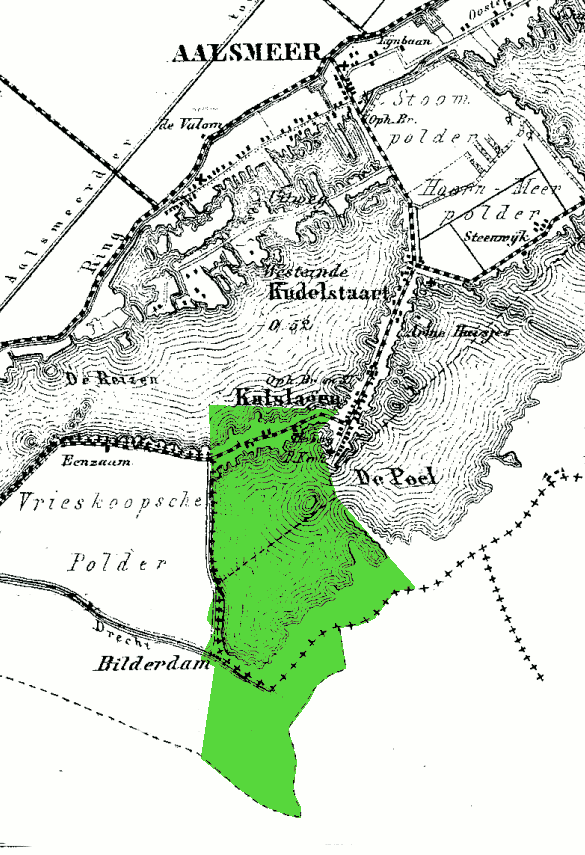
The municipality of Kalslagen, on an 1868 map of Aalsmeer.

Coat of Arms

Kalslagen en Bilderdam is a former municipality in the Dutch province of North Holland. It existed between 1817 and 1854, and was sometimes simply called Kalslagen.

The municipality covered the hamlet of Calslagen and a number of polders to the south, including part of the hamlet of Bilderdam. In 1854, the municipality was divided between Aalsmeer, Uithoorn, and Leimuiden; the hamlet Calslagen itself became a part of the municipality Aalsmeer.
