= De Kwakel =

- Interactive map of De Kwakel
- Coordinates: 52°14′27″N 4°47′27″E
- Country: Netherlands
- Province: North Holland
- Municipality: Uithoorn

Population (2006)
  - Total: 3,880

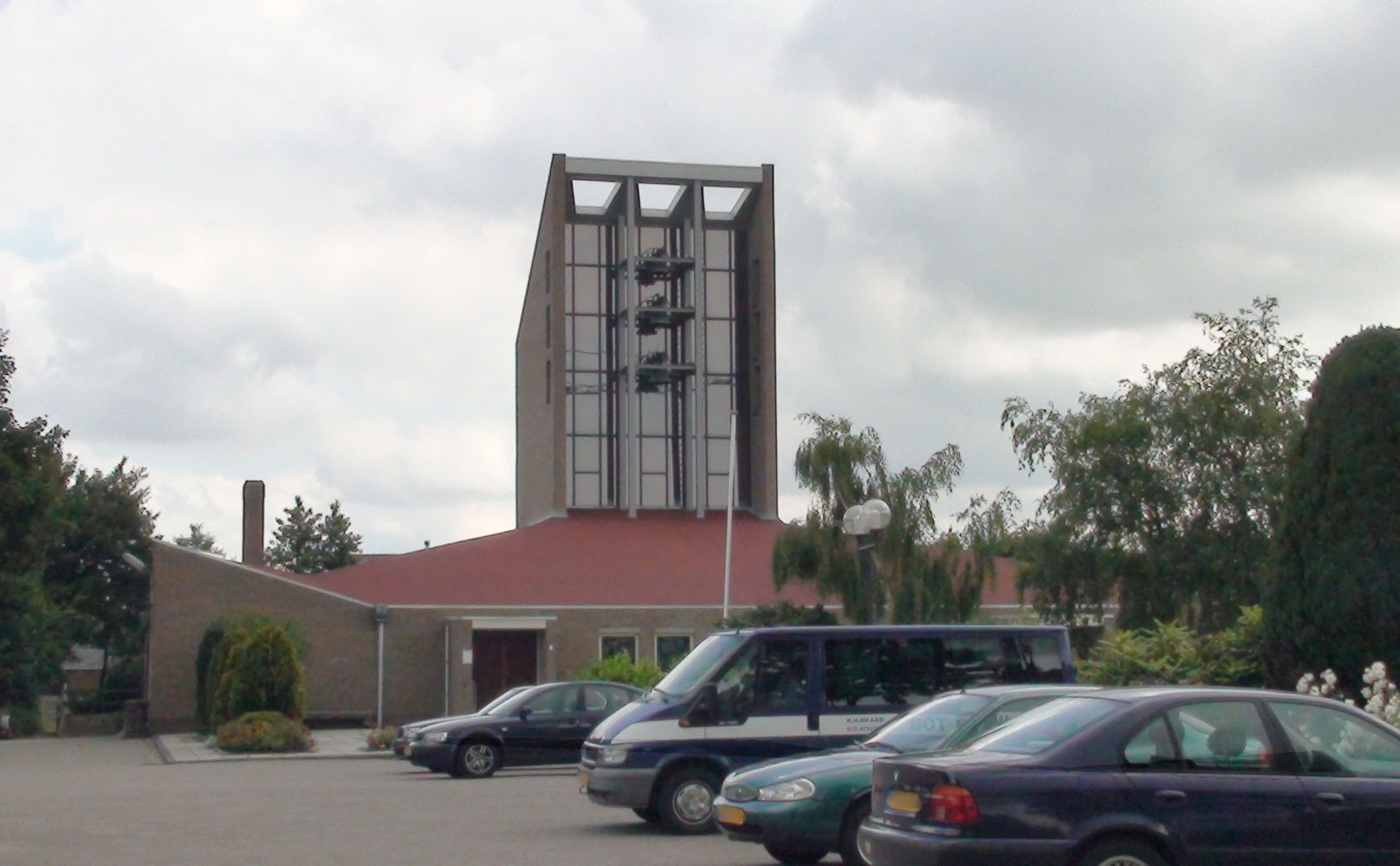
Picture of the church of De Kwakel, Netherlands

De Kwakel is a village in the municipality of Uithoorn, North Holland, the Netherlands, near the border with South Holland. Having 3880 inhabitants in 2006, it is close to Kudelstaart and Aalsmeer.
