= Michael Buskermolen =

Dutch footballer

Personal information
- Full name: Michael Buskermolen
- Date of birth: 2 March 1972 (age 54)
- Place of birth: Leimuiden, Netherlands
- Height: 1.83 m (6 ft 0 in)
- Position: Midfielder

Youth career
- RKDES
- 1988–1990: AZ

Senior career*
Years	Team	Apps	(Gls)
1990–2006	AZ	399	(52)
- * Club domestic league appearances and goals

Michael Buskermolen (born 2 March 1972) is a Dutch former professional footballer who played for AZ for his entire professional career.

== Club career ==
He spent all of his sixteen-year career at AZ, initially appearing for first team in the 1990–91 campaign. Buskermolen is also called "Mr. AZ" for his ultimate faithfulness.

A left-sided midfielder, Buskermolen played 399 league games for AZ following his debut and later worked in AZ's youth department. His final appearance was as a substitute in the 5-0 defeat of RBC Roosendaal on February 7, 2006.

== Personal life ==
Buskermolen has lived almost his entire life in the village of Kudelstaart, where his father grew roses. After retiring as a player, Buskermolen coached the AZ youth teams until 2015, when he finally decided to leave the club and start his own football school in Kudelstaart.

== See also ==
- One club man
