= Meerewijck =

Coordinates: 52.226442°N 4.664214°E

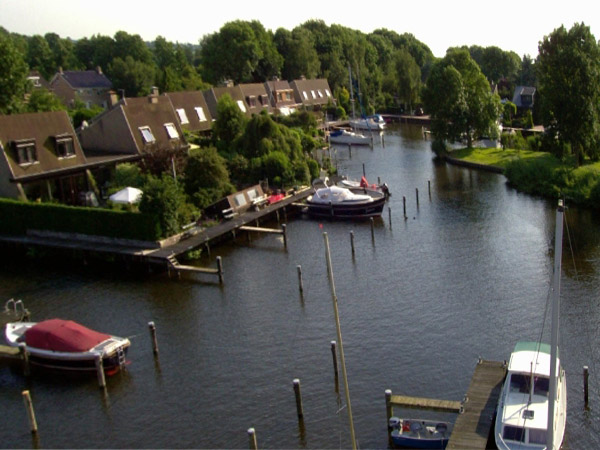
Meerewijck - Wonen aan het water

Meerewijck is the name of a recreation and living quarter of Leimuiden in the Dutch province of South Holland. It is a part of the municipality of Kaag en Braassem, and is situated about 12 km south-west of Amsterdam.

Meerewijck consists of about 100 semi-bungalows which are grouped around a marina at the Ringvaart. Via the Ringvaart, several lakes such as the Braassemer Meer, the Westeinderplassen, and the Kagerplassen can be reached by boat within minutes.
