= Margaretha Coppier =

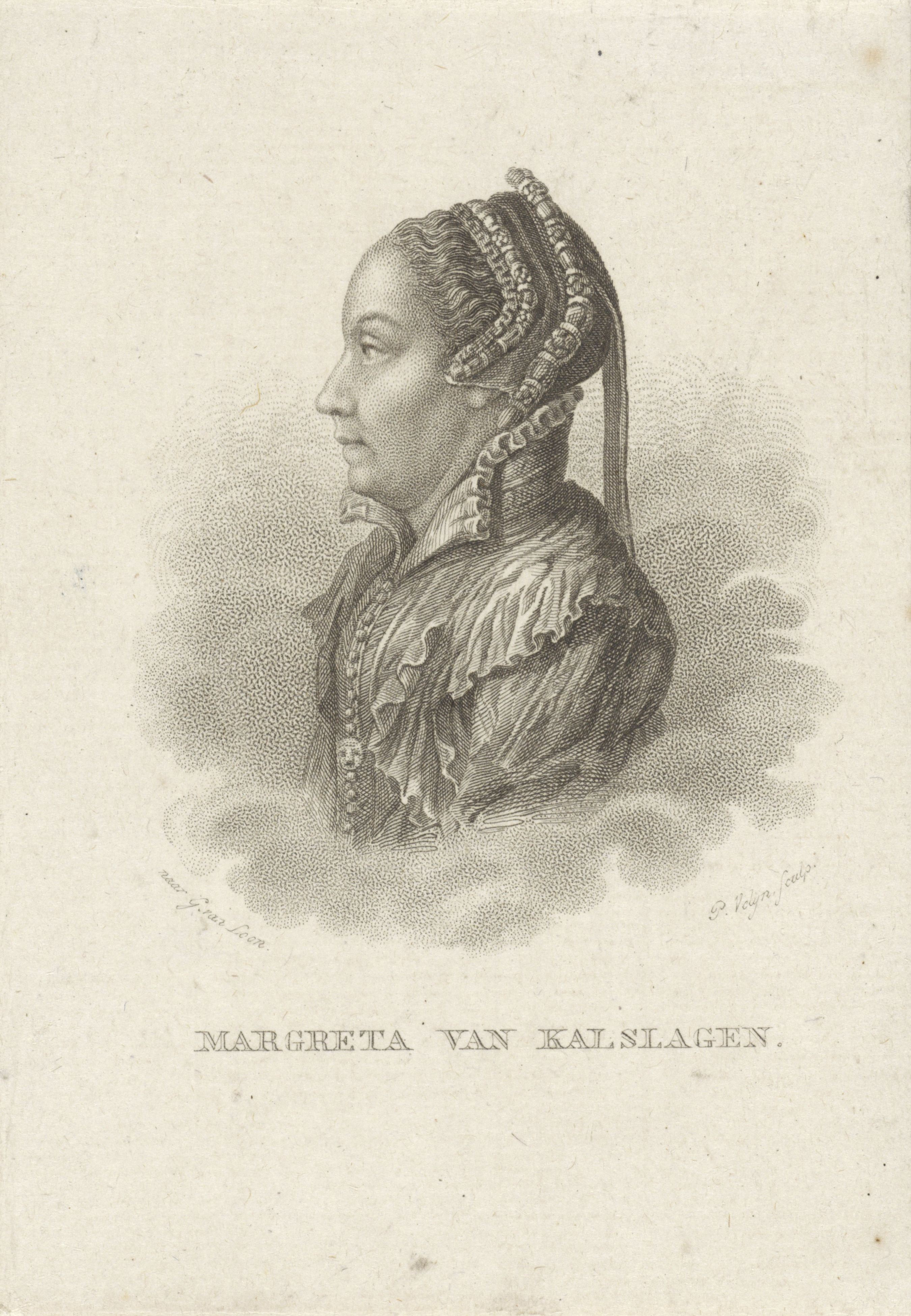
Margaretha van Kalslagen 1797 - 1836

Margaretha Coppier or Margaretha van Kalslagen (1516–1597) was a Dutch noble and a heroine of the Dutch war of liberation.

Coppier was born in Alphen aan den Rijn, the daughter of Jacob Coppier, lord of Kalslagen and Alphen, and Margaretha van Roon. Her brothers and half-brothers all became active members of the Dutch rebellion. Coppier married Joachim Burgher, a polymath known as "Polites" from Goes, who before their marriage had become the scribe of Antwerp in 1541. After his death in 1569 she married his successor as scribe, Willem Martini.

In 1574 William the Silent devised a plan to liberate Antwerp from within by infiltrating the city with soldiers who would take shelter in houses and inns. Both Coppier's brother Andries and her husband took part in the plot. The Spanish governor Luis de Requesens y Zúñiga however became aware of the plot and had the city gates sealed, every suspicious person rounded up and every house searched. Andries Coppier was caught and tortured to death without revealing names. The four leaders of the plot had taken refuge at the house of Coppier, who hid them just before her house was searched. Her stoicism during the search saved these people and possibly many others who could have been revealed under torture. She died in Breda.

Her story was first relayed by Pieter Bor in 1621, but Coppier owns her reputation to Pieter Corneliszoon Hooft, who described her heroism extensively in his Dutch historic tales of 1647. In 1839, J.I.D. Nepveu reworked Hooft's narrative into a historical novel and in 1842 Valentijn Bing painted the scene in which the Spanish soldiers are seated around the table in which one of the rebel leaders is hidden.
