= Tebu =

The word Tebu can refer to

- the Tubu people in Chad, Niger and Libya
  - the Tebu languages spoken by the Tubu people
- Tebu is also a name for sugar cane in Indonesia
- TEBU Abrv. in railroad terminology, a "Tractive Effort Booster Unit", or Slug
- Teerbedrijf Uithoorn (TEBU), Dutch coal tar processing company
- Tebu mountain, high point in Apetina, Suriname
- Xtep (Chinese: 特步; pinyin: Tèbù), Chinese sports equipment manufacturer
