= Ruud Koopmans =

Dutch sociologist

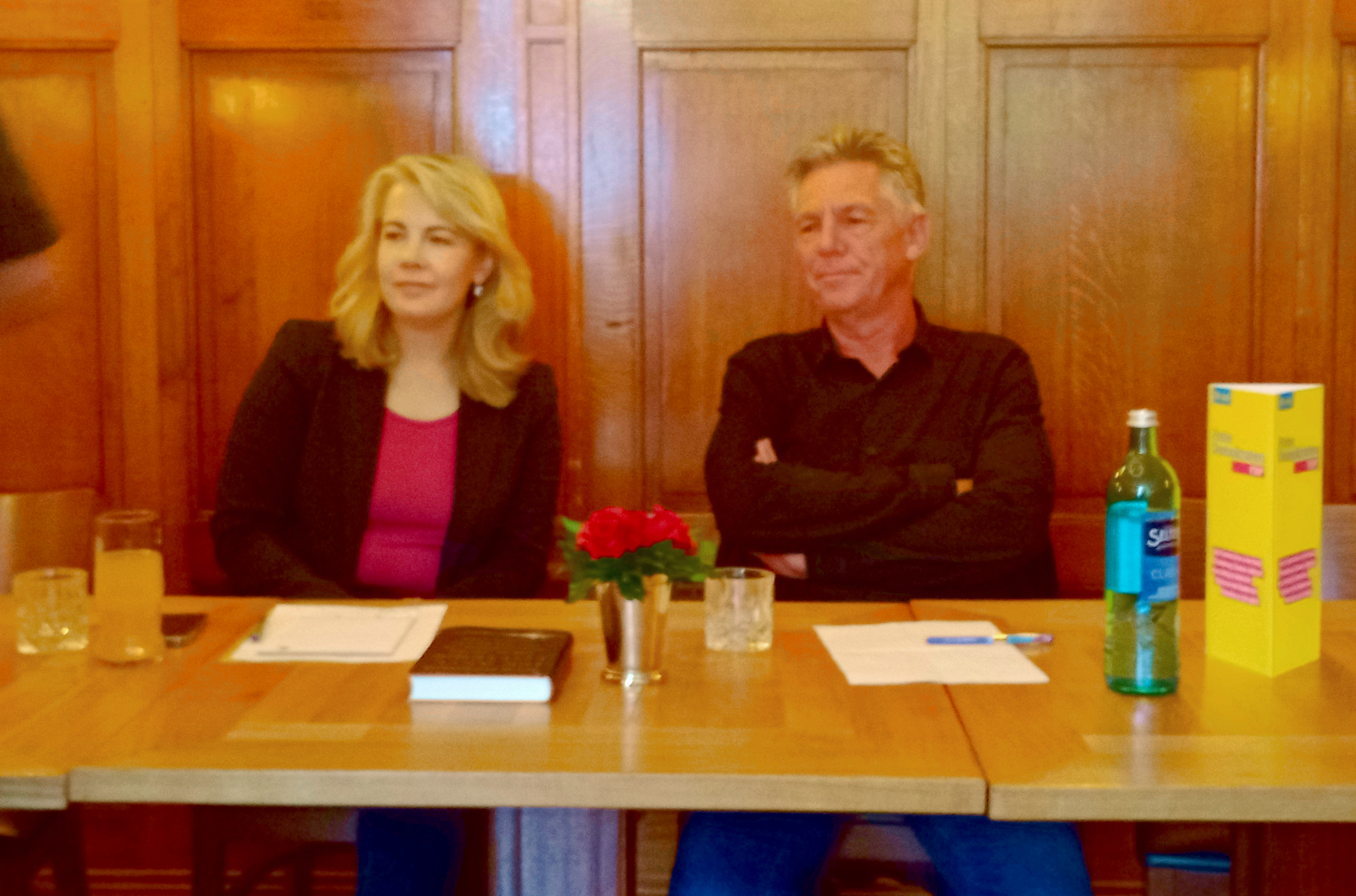
Linda Teuteberg and Ruud Koopmans, 2023

Ruud Koopmans (born 2 February 1961, in Uithoorn) is a Dutch sociologist and professor at the Humboldt University of Berlin. His research focuses on migration, social integration and transnationalization.

== Biography ==
A native of Uithoorn, Ruud Koopmans studied political science at the University of Amsterdam (UvA), where he obtained a MA in 1987. In 1992, he received a PhD from UvA for his dissertation on the post-war social movements and political system in West Germany, which he wrote under the supervision of Hanspeter Kriesi. After a short stint as researcher at the Social and Cultural Planning Office in The Hague, Koopmans joined the WZB Berlin Social Science Center in 1994, where he continues to work today (2019) as research director of the department on migration, integration and transnationalization. In addition to his position at the WZB, Koopmans worked from 2003 to 2010 as professor of sociology at the Free University of Amsterdam and has been since 2010 a guest professor on political science at UvA. Moreover, Koopmans became professor of sociology and migration research at the Humboldt University of Berlin in 2013. In terms of professional duties, Koopmans performs or has performed editorial duties for the Journal of Ethnic and Migration Studies, International Journal of Comparative Migration Studies, Mobilization and the American Journal of Sociology, among others. He is notably a member of the board of trustees of the German Center for Integration and Migration Research (DeZIM) and of the academic advisory board of the Federal Office for Migration and Refugees (BAMF).

== Research ==
Ruud Koopmans' research fields include immigration and the integration of migrants, ethnic inequality and ethno-cultural conflicts, religious fundamentalism, the politics of globalization, social movements and evolutionary sociology. Many of Koopmans' research articles, especially on immigration, have been co-authored with Paul Statham.

=== Research on social movements ===
Ruud Koopmans' earliest field of research has been the analysis of social movements in Western Europe. Together with Hanspeter Kriesi, Jan Willem Duyvendak and Marco Giugni, Koopmans has extensively studied the relationship between the structure of political opportunities and the mobilisation patterns of social movements in Western Europe in the 1970s and 1980s. In particular, Koopmans highlights in his analysis of West German protest movements from 1965 to 1989 how facilitation, repression and likelihood of success frame activists' choices among strategies of innovation, increased participation or increased militancy. Relatedly, in research co-authored with Duyvendak, he shows that anti-nuclear movements' success in opposing nuclear energy has been determined mainly by the movements' ability to seize political opportunities by changing public opinion and mobilizing followers, no matter the shape of the evidence upon which the anti-nuclear movement's claims were based. In the late 1990s and early 2000s, Koopmans continued to contribute further to the study of protest, making e.g. the case for political claims analysis and protest event analysis as methodological advances, and advocating in favour of political opportunity structure as analytical framework.

=== Research on the European Far-Right ===
Koopmans' research on new social movements brought him to study Western Europe's far right movements, which were on the rise in the 1990s. For instance, investigating the causes of racist and extreme right violence in the early 1990s, Koopmans argues that such violence is rather a result of political elites attempting to exploit opportunities for political mobilization than of the extreme right's grievances with foreigners and asylum seekers, leading to a paradoxical situation where racist violence is lower in countries with strong far-right parties (e.g. France or Denmark). Moreover, in a study of the dynamics between repression and mobilization of the German extreme right in the 1990s, Koopmans finds that situational police repression generally tended to escalate mobilization by the far-right, whereas more indirect, institutional repression such as bans of organizations and demonstrations or trials and court rulings against far-right activists had a clearly negative impact on the extreme right's level of mobilization. In research with Statham, Koopmans compared the success of the extreme right in Germany during the 1990s, where it was confined to the role of influential outsider, and Italy, where it has become strongly integrated in the country's political institutions, and traced these outcomes to differences between both countries discursive and institutional opportunity structures. Using the evolution of the German far right in the 1990s as example, Koopmans has also showcased how "discursive opportunities", i.e., opportunities to mobilize public attention, shape the actions of social movements, whose activities evolve in reaction to their visibility, resonance and legitimacy in the public sphere. More specifically, together with Susan Olzak, Koopmans has explored how differences in public visibility, resonance and legitimacy of right-wing violence in Germany affected the spatial and temporal distribution of violence against different target groups, linking the violence with "discursive opportunities". Finally, turning to the Dutch far-right, Koopmans – along with Jasper Muis – has analysed the rise of Pim Fortuyn and the LPF in 2002, finding that discursive opportunities significantly contributed to Fortuyn's success with regard to gaining voters' support and his ability to mediatize his claims, which then induced further feedback loops.

=== Research on migration and integration ===
A major field of Koopmans' research has been immigration and the integration of immigrants. In early research with Statham, he finds little evidence that migrants and ethnic minorities erode nation-states' sovereignty and mixed evidence for their contribution to the internal cultural differentiation of states, but strong support for the continuing relevance of the nation-state regarding the in- or exclusion of minorities. Studying how the access to citizenship shapes immigrants' mobilisation, Statham and Koopmans find that mobilisation to be highly prevalent in Germany, where immigrants were historically largely excluded from the national community, less so in multicultural Netherlands and lowest in Britain with its assimilationist incorporation model. In another study, Koopmans and Statham study migration and ethnic relations through the lens of the political opportunity structure approach. In further analysis of immigrants' mobilisation, Koopmans finds that immigrants are highly engaged in public debates on issues relevant to them the more inclusive the local incorporation regime is, though cross-local differences are dwarfed by differences between nations, suggesting a continuously strong role for the nation-state regarding political integration. Finally, investigating the impact of migrants' participation in associations on their political integration in Berlin, Koopmans, Maria Berger and Christian Galonska don't find any significant impact of such participation on migrants' interest in German politics, though migrants active in ethnic organisations tend to also be more politically active. Koopmans' "early" research on immigration and diversity, along with other research by e.g. Statham, Giugni and Florence Passy, is reflected in Contested Citizenship; the book argues that the construction of citizenship is the key determinant of Europe's immigrant populations' experiences and notably challenges the notion that "multiculturalism is always good for immigrants".

Studying how integration policies and welfare states have affected the integration of immigrants in a broad range of Western European countries, Koopmans finds that policies which fail to provide strong incentives to immigrants to become fluent in the host country's language and develop contacts with members of other ethnic groups, when combined with a generous welfare state, have resulted in low labour force participation, high segregation and a disproportionate likelihood of criminal behaviour, as e.g. in Sweden, Belgium and the Netherlands, whereas countries with either assimilationist integration policies or a relatively lean welfare state have achieved better integration. Moreover, in a comparison of the socio-cultural integration of naturalised and non-naturalised immigrants in the Netherlands, France and Germany, Koopmans and Evelyn Ersanili find that limited conditions for naturalisation in terms of cultural assimilation may promote integration, as shown in Germany and France, but also that allowing immigrants to hold dual nationalities doesn't have substantial negative effects. In further research on immigrants' citizenship rights in Europe, Koopmans, Ines Michalowski and Stine Waibel find no evidence for cross-national convergence on these rights, the inclusivity of which has stagnated from 2002 to 2008 as right-wing parties countermobilized and slowed or reversed liberalization of citizenship rights. Overall, reviewing the multicultural policies in the main European and Anglo-Saxon destination countries, Koopmans argues that multicultural policies have had "little effect on socioeconomic integration, some positive effects on political integration, and negative impacts on sociocultural integration", with religious rights as the main source of controversy.

=== Research on the European public sphere ===
Another area of Koopmans' research has been the evolution of the European public sphere. Together with Jessica Erbe, Koopmans finds that whether and how political communication is Europeanized varies substantially between policy fields, with differences strongly depending on whether the policy mandate lays with governments or with the EU, suggesting that a further transfer of competencies to the EU would also entail the Europeanization of further parts of the public sphere. In another study, Koopmans moreover finds that governments and executive actors have been the main beneficiaries of the Europeanisation of public debates relative to legislative and party actors and especially compared to civil society actors, who are weakly represented in the European public sphere, which in turn affects actors' public support for – or opposition to – European institutions and integration. Koopmans' and Statham's research on the European public sphere have been compiled in an edited volume, The Making of a European Public Sphere, which addresses how European integration in the 1990s and 2000s was debated in mass media and how that integration has shifted the power balance between governments, parliaments and civil society.

== Personal life ==
Koopmans is married to a Turkish woman, and they have a daughter together.
