= Aalsmeer =

- Municipality
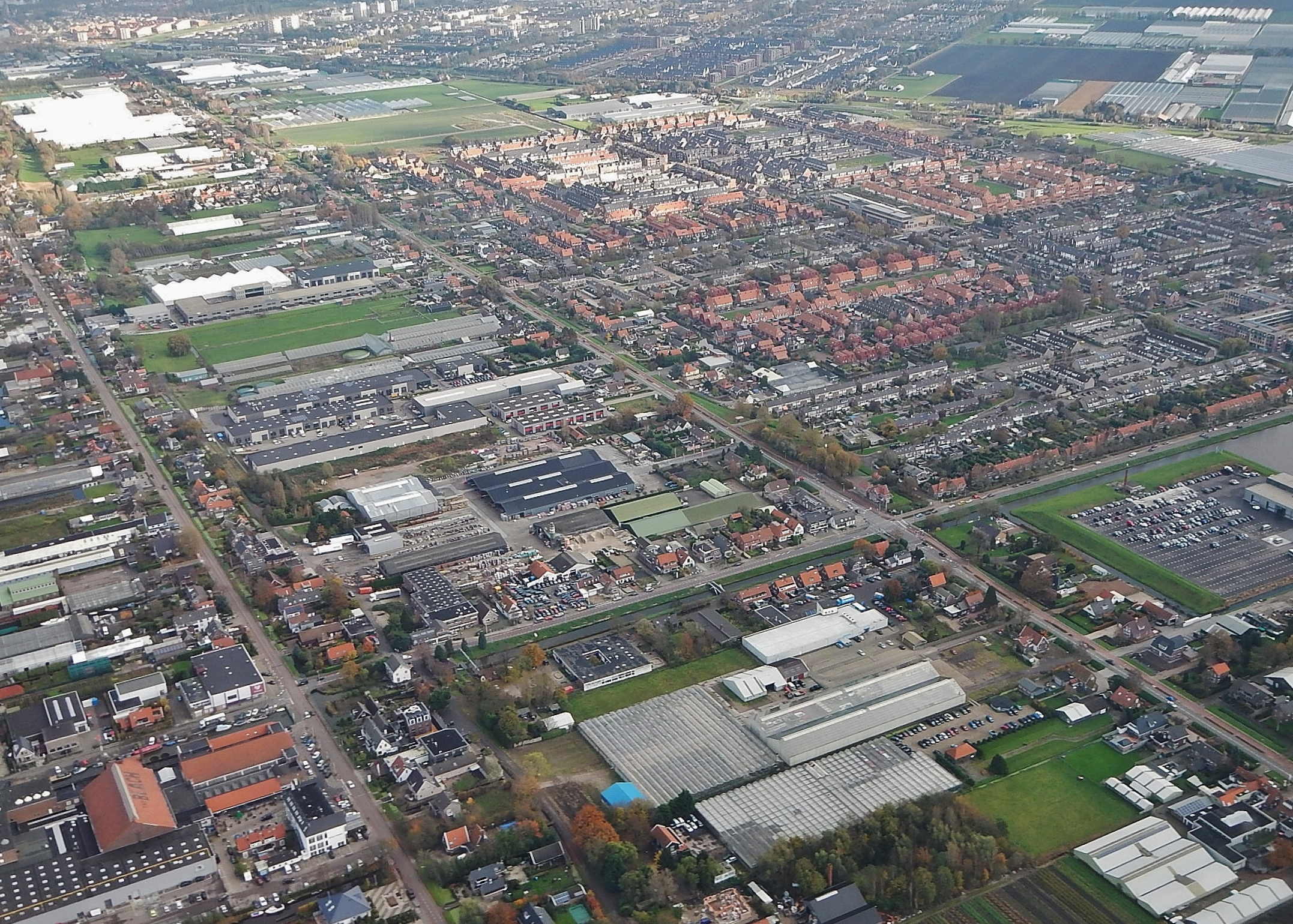
- Aerial photo of Aalsmeer, 2014

- Flag Coat of arms
- Nickname: Flower capital of the world
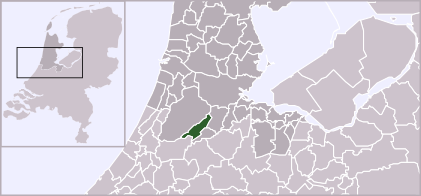
- Location in North Holland

- Location in the Netherlands
- Coordinates: 52°16′N 4°45′E
- Country: Netherlands
- Province: North Holland
- Region: Amsterdam metropolitan area

Government
  - Body: Municipal council
  - Mayor: Gido Oude Kotte (CDA)
  - Aldermen: List of aldermen: Sven Spaargaren (VVD); Bart Kabout (CDA); Sybrand de Vries (D66)

Area
  - Total: 32.29 km^{2} (12.47 sq mi)
  - Land: 20.12 km^{2} (7.77 sq mi)
  - Water: 12.17 km^{2} (4.70 sq mi)
- Elevation: −0.1 m (−0.33 ft)

Population (January 2021)
  - Total: 31,991
  - Density: 1,590/km^{2} (4,100/sq mi)
- Demonym: Aalsmeerder
- Time zone: UTC+1 (CET)
  - Summer (DST): UTC+2 (CEST)
- Postcode: 1430–1433
- Area code: 0297
- Website: Aalsmeer.nl

Aalsmeer (Dutch: [aːlsˈmeːr]) is a municipality and a town in the Netherlands, in the province of North Holland. Its name is derived from the Dutch for eel (aal) and lake (meer). Aalsmeer is bordered by the Westeinderplassen lake, the largest open water of the Randstad, and the Ringvaart Canal. The town is located 13 km (8 mi) southwest of Amsterdam.

The town is sometimes referred to as the flower capital of the world, as the largest flower auction in the world is based in Aalsmeer, along with numerous nurseries and an experimental station for floriculture.

== Population centres ==
The municipality of Aalsmeer consists of the following cities, towns, and villages: Aalsmeer, Kudelstaart, Oosteinde, as well as the hamlet Calslagen.

== Geology ==
Aalsmeer is located on the border of the former Haarlem Lake. The older portion of the town is built on peat, and is surrounded by polders. The polders consist of loamy soil and are 9–15 feet (2.7–4.6 m) below sea level.

== History ==
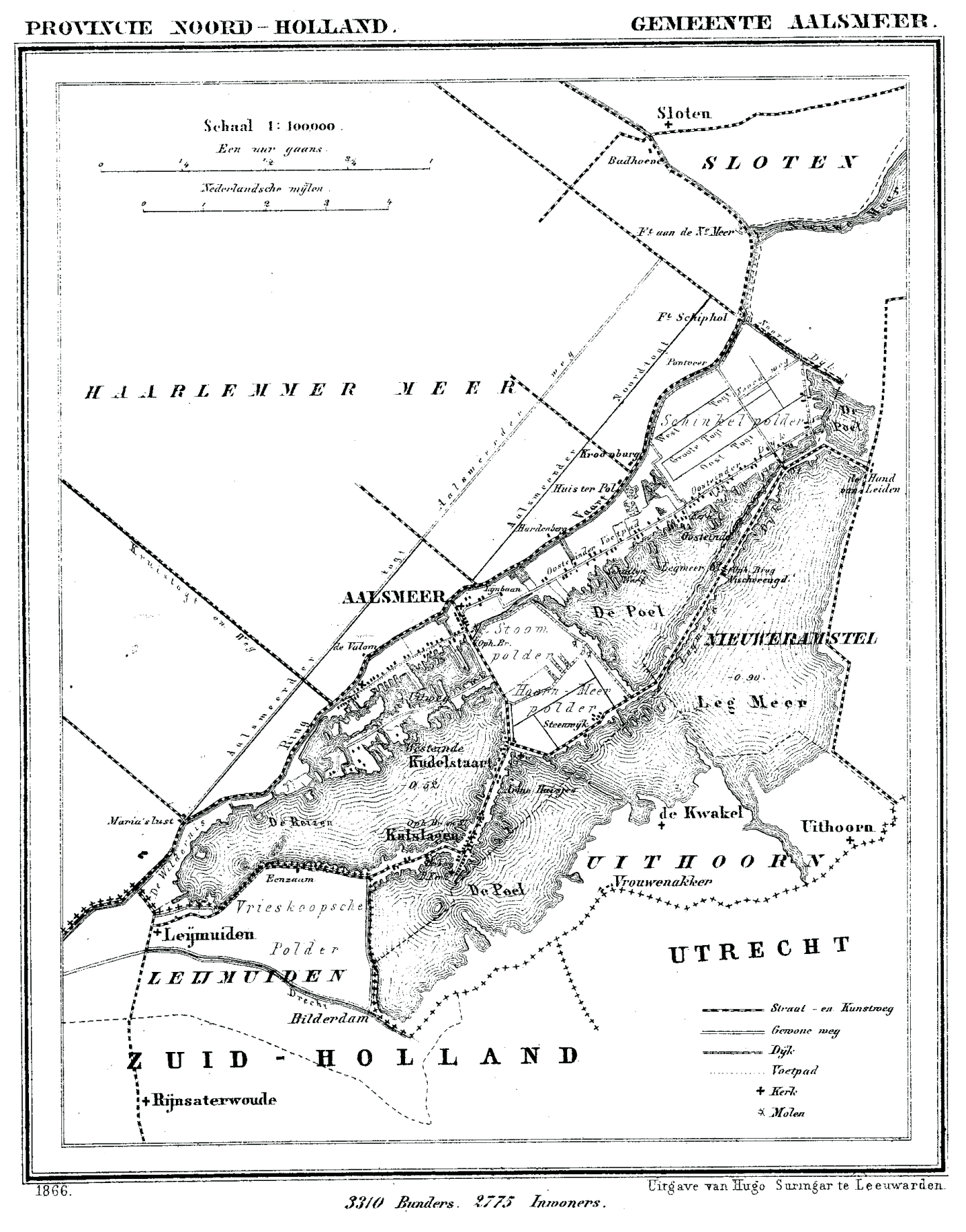
Aalsmeer in 1866.

Aalsmeer is first referenced in a document from 1133 in which it is called "Alsmar" and is granted to the Abbey of Rijnsburg. Diederik VII van Kleef confirmed this grant in an act in 1199. The area was then a wilderness with alders and willow forests.

In its surroundings, large tracts of land were dug up for peat, creating large lakes and ponds such as Oosteinderpoel (East End Pool), Schinkelpoel (Schinkel Pool), Stommeer (Stom Lake), Hornmeer (Horn Lake), Legmeer (Leg Lake), and the Westeinderplassen (West End Ponds). This left little land for agriculture, causing Aalsmeer's inhabitants to switch to fishery. The land was cultivated intensely, mostly for tree nurseries.

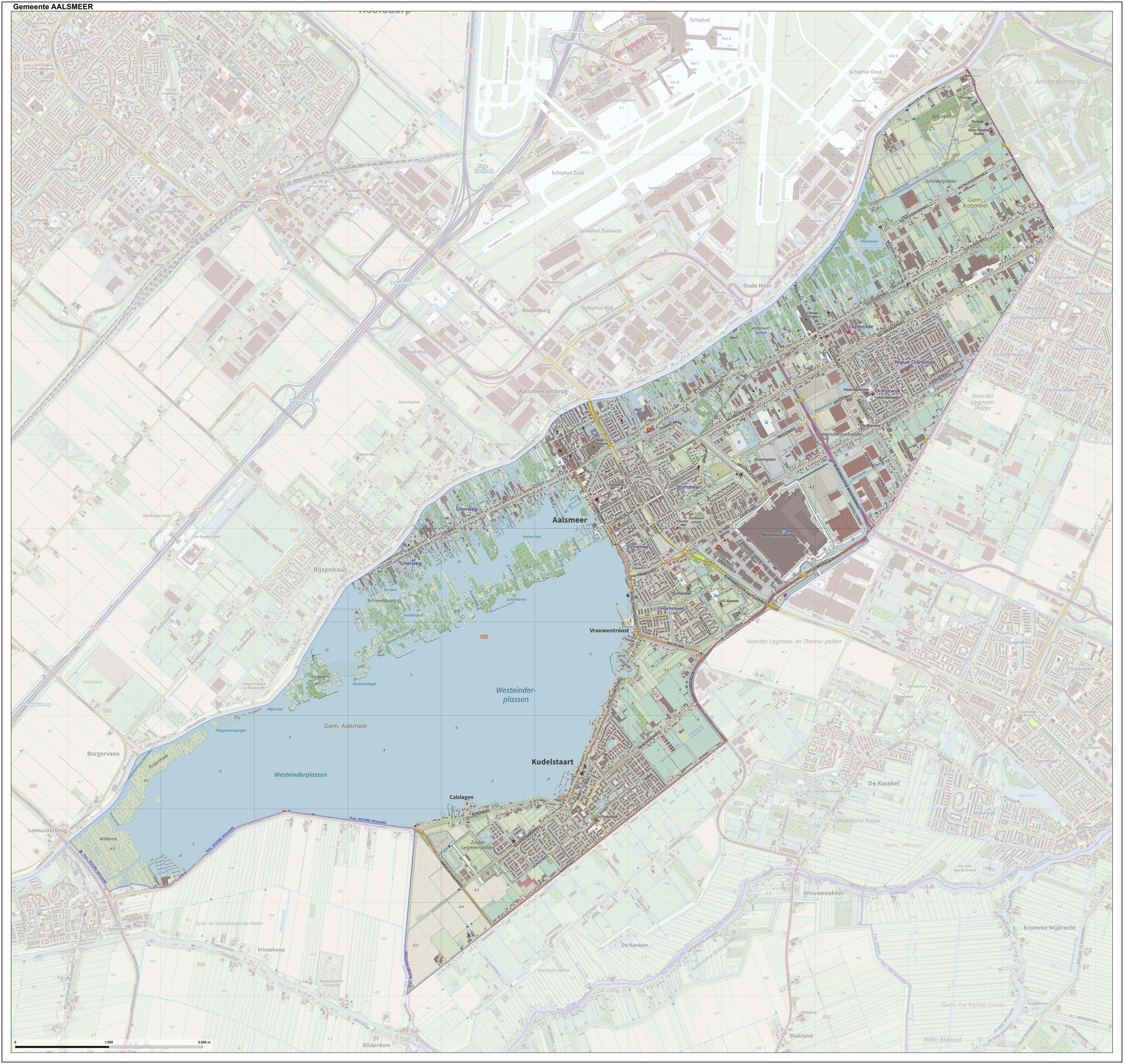
Topographic map of Aalsmeer, June 2015

The lack of dry land was countered by reclaiming some of the lakes, starting with Stom Lake in 1650, and followed by Horn Lake in 1674. In 1852, the large Haarlem Lake, bordering on Aalsmeer, was made into a polder. Then followed Schinkelpoel, Oosteinderpoel, and Legmeer. Peat was no longer dug up and the fishing business declined. Yet horticulture increased, especially strawberry cultivation, which peaked between 1850 and 1885. The strawberry became the symbol for the flag of Aalsmeer: red (fruit), green (leaf), and black (soil). The cultivation of flowers began circa 1880, first with roses in greenhouses.

The growers would sell their strawberries and flowers to distributors who would bring them with barges to the market in Amsterdam. But the trade shifted to Aalsmeer where auctions began to be held in local cafés. In 1912 two auction businesses were established: Centrale Aalsmeerse Veiling (Central Aalsmeer Auction) in the town's centre and Bloemenlust in Aalsmeer East.

=== World War II ===
During World War 2, Aalsmeer gained a reputation for its Nazi support, mostly because of its fanatical National Socialistic mayor and a handful of fascist supporters. The highest supreme commander of the German Wehrmacht in the Netherlands, Friedrich Christiansen, was a regular visitor. Following the war, more than a hundred court cases were held against Nazi supporters from Aalsmeer.

=== Post war ===
In 1950 Aalsmeer had 12,500 inhabitants. In 1968 the two flower auction businesses merged, and in 1972 a new large auction building was completed in South Aalsmeer and expanded in 1999.

== Local government ==
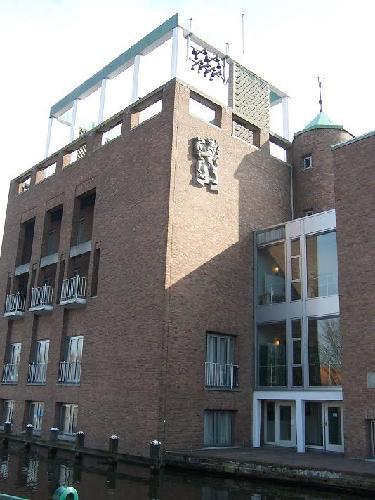
Aalsmeer Town Hall

The municipal council of Aalsmeer consists of 23 seats, which since 2026 are divided as follows:

- People's Party for Freedom and Democracy (VVD) – 8 seats
- Christian Democratic Appeal (CDA) – 5 seats
- Absoluut Aalsmeer (AA) – 3 seats
- FlorAalsmeer (FA) – 3 seats
- Democrats 66 (D66) – 2 seats
- GreenLeft-Labour Party (GroenLinks–PvdA) – 2 seats

The outgoing municipal executive consists of CDA, VVD and D66, with Gido Oude Kotte (CDA) as mayor.

== Public transport ==
The bus interchange in Aalsmeer is called the Hortensiaplein, where the buses meet. These services are:

- 171 - Aalsmeer - Bovenkerk - Amstelveen - Amsterdam Bijlmer ArenA Station
- 198 - Aalsmeer - Amsterdam Schiphol Airport (Schiphol Sternet)
- 340 - (Mijdrecht 2x per hour) - Uithoorn - Aalsmeer - Hoofddorp Station - Hoofddorp - Heemstede - Haarlem - Haarlem Station
- 357 - (Kudelstaart 2x per hour) - Aalsmeer - Amstelveen - Amsterdam City Centre - Amsterdam Centraal
- 342 - Schiphol, Airport - Schipholgebouw Schiphol, - P30 Parkeerterrein Schiphol-Rijk, Beechavenue - Aalsmeer, Dorpsstraat - Aalsmeer, Zwarteweg/N196 - Uithoorn, Poelweg Uithoorn, - Noorddammerweg Uithoorn, - Burg. Kootlaan Uithoorn, - Uithoorn, Busstation
- N57 - Amsterdam Centraal - Amsterdam City Centre - Amstelveen - Bovenkerk - Aalsmeer (Nightbus)

All of these services are very frequent, half-hourly or more frequent.

== Economy ==
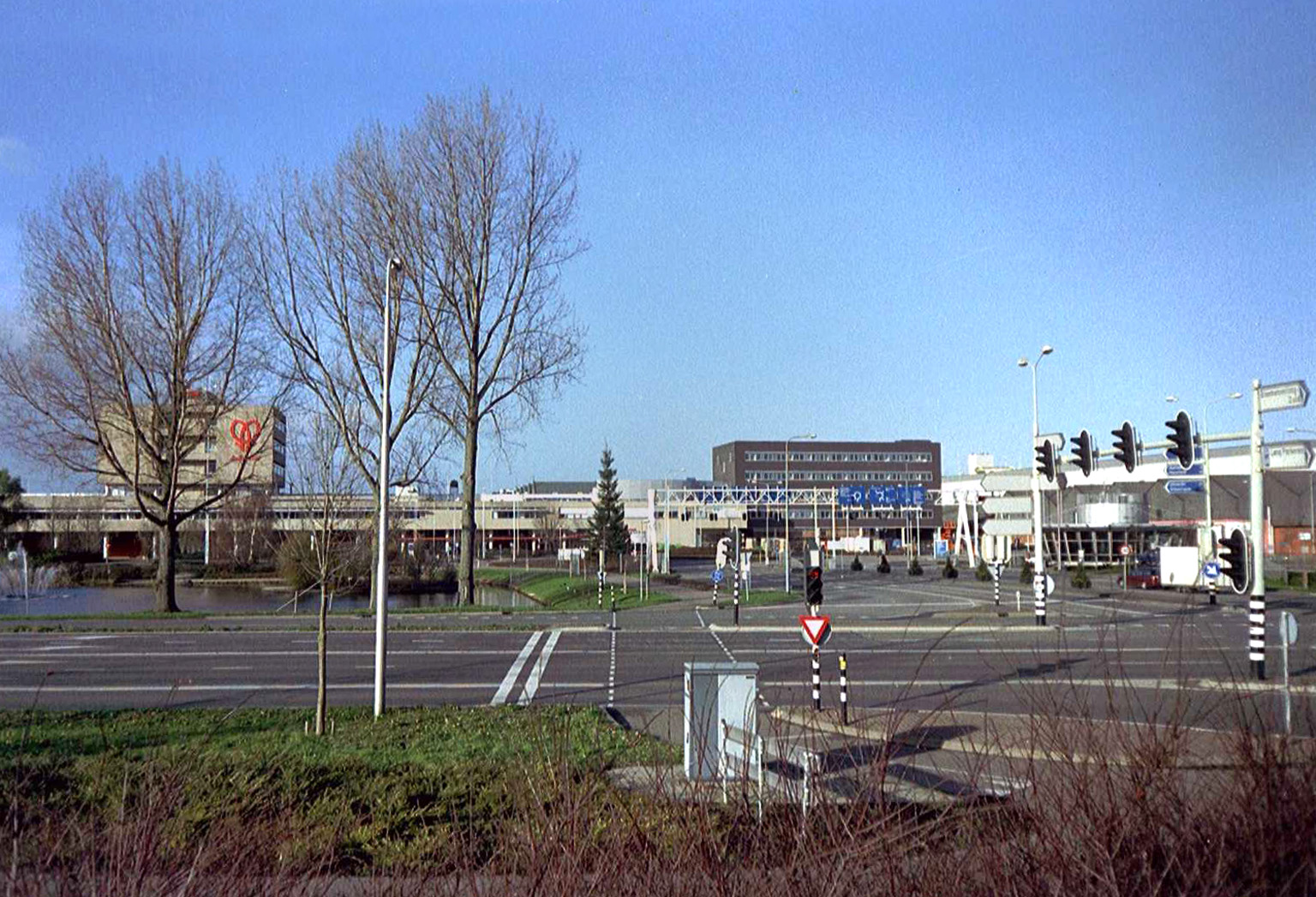
Flower Auction Aalsmeer.

Having 999,000 square metres (10,750,000 sq ft) of floor space, the flower auction building of FloraHolland is one of the largest commercial buildings in the world. Its close proximity to Schiphol Airport allows the growers access to markets worldwide. On 1 January 2008 the Aalsmeer flower auction merged with the united auctions of Naaldwijk and Rijnsburg under the name FloraHolland, and is the largest auction market in the world. The flowers that are grown and sold here are carnations, roses, lilacs, freesias, chrysanthemums, cyclamens, and begonias.

The Endemol television studios are located in the former Central Auction building. The Bloemenlust building is nowadays a sports, event, and congress centre. Dominating the Ringvaart canal are the large building halls of Royal De Vries Scheepsbouw.

Agriculture and manufacturing also play an important role in the economy of the locality. Dairy, beef, potatoes, vegetables, and fruit are the areas within agriculture, and the types of manufacturing in the city are farm products, sporting goods, boats, and packaging material.

== Culture ==
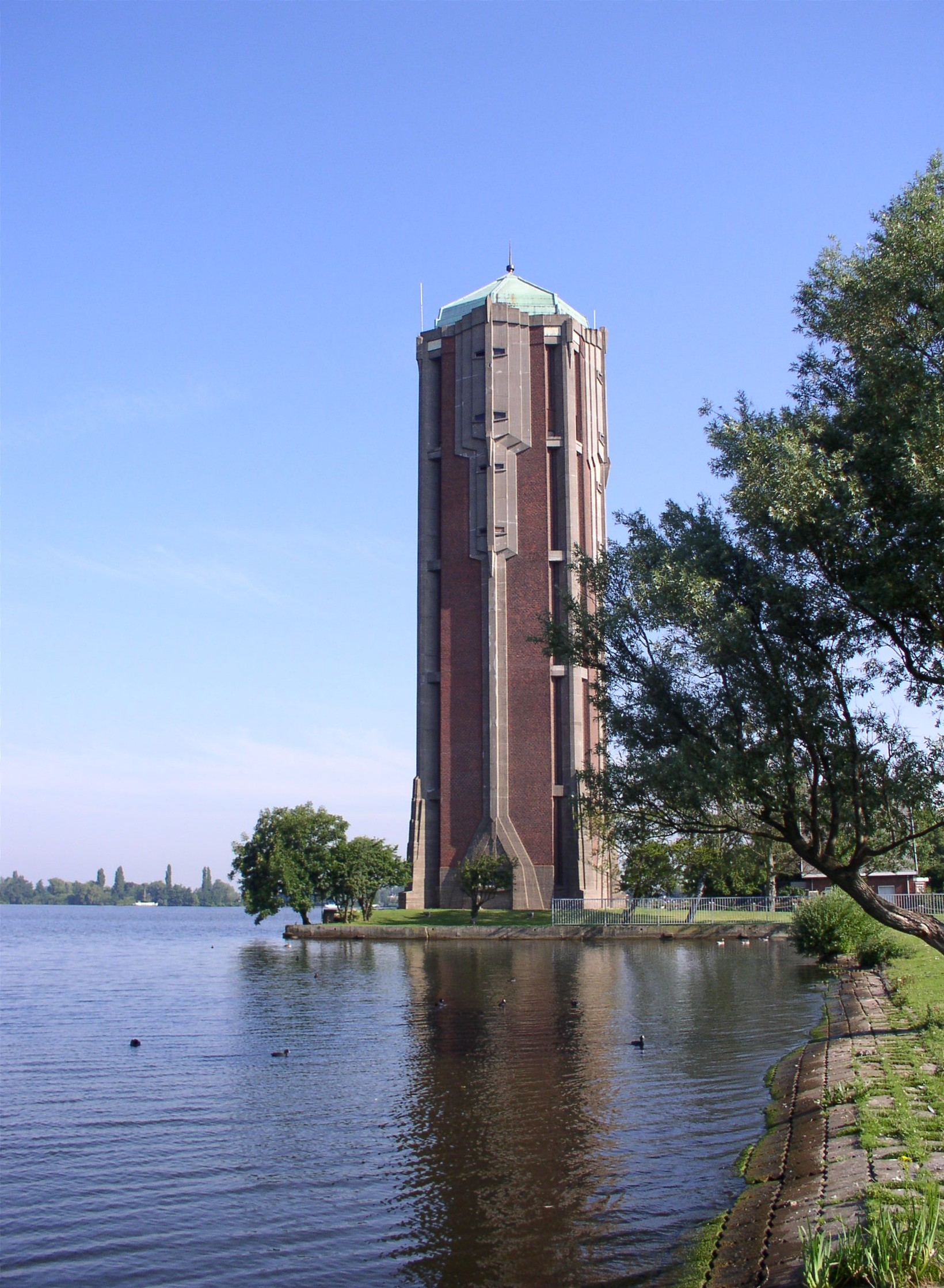
The Water Tower of Aalsmeer was completed in 1928 in an Art Deco style.

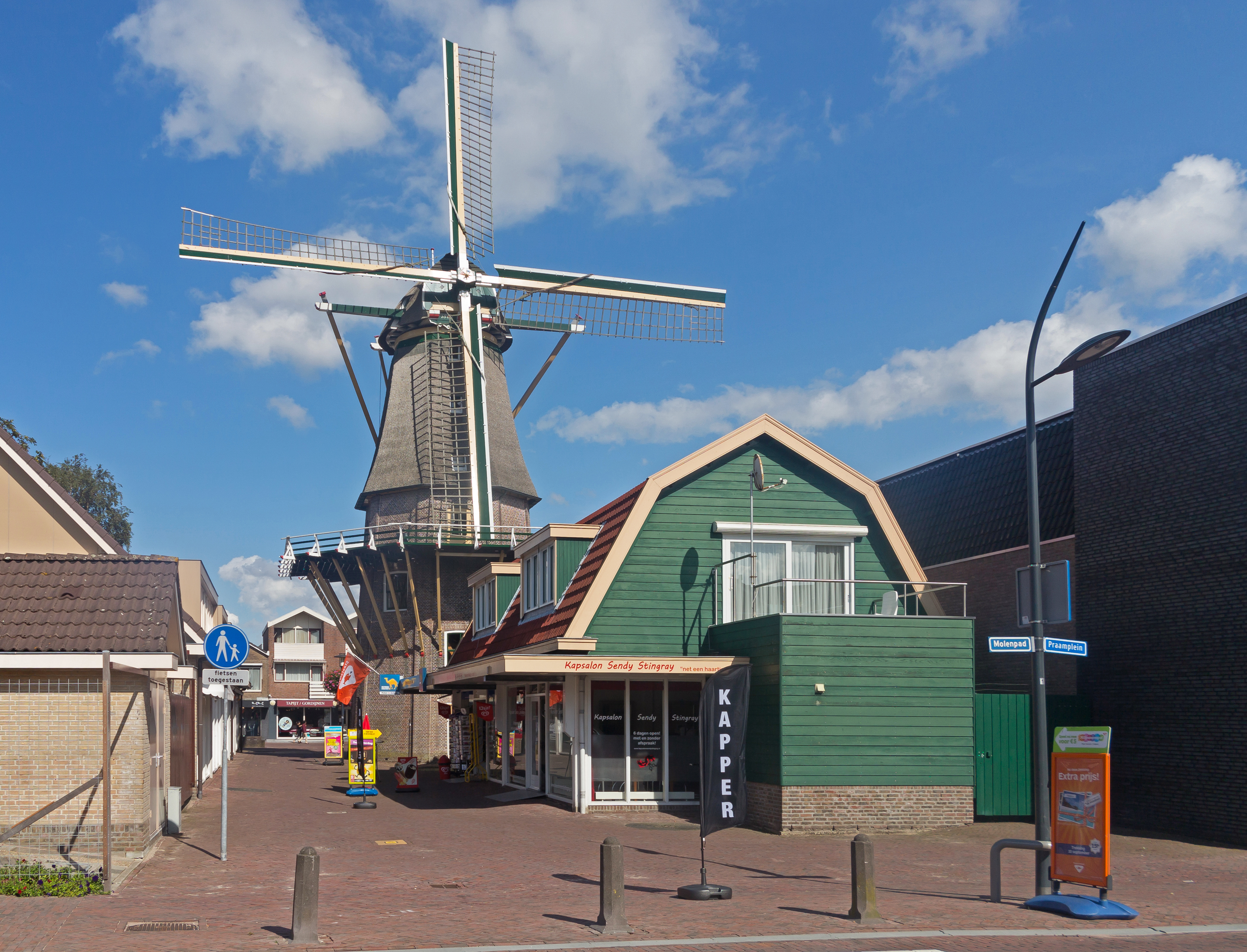
Windmill: stellingmolen De Leeuw

=== Events ===
Aalsmeer has a number of annual events and festivals. The most famous was the Flower parade (Bloemencorso), every first Saturday in September. After 60 years, this tradition was discontinued in 2007 as the flower auction stopped its sponsorship. Other annual events are the "Pramenrace", every second Saturday in September and the Bands Night (Bandjesavond) in June.

=== Music scene ===
Aalsmeer has a rich music scene. The best known groups and artists from Aalsmeer and Kudelstaart since 1970 are:

- Eton Crop
- Hobo String band
- The Whatts
- Livin' at A
- Madeliefjes
- Los Boundros
- Café Blue (later: Koel Bewaren)
- Ten Beers After
- Katelijne van Otterloo Group
- Social Animal

=== Sports ===
The handball club HV Aalsmeer has won the Dutch Championship several times.

== Notable people ==
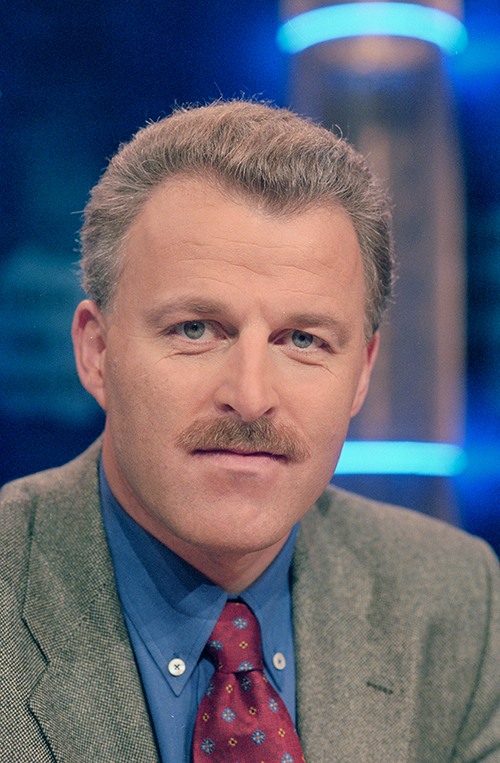
Peter R. de Vries, 1995

- Jan de Pous (1920 in Aalsmeer – 1996) a Dutch politician and economist
- Ada van Keulen (1920 in Aalsmeer – 2010) a Dutch woman participant in the resistance in WWII
- Joost Hoffscholte (born 1942) a retired Dutch politician, Mayor of Aalsmeer 1985 to 2007, lives in Aalsmeer
- Fred Borgman (1946 in Aalsmeer – 11 May 1996) was a Dutch politician, an alderman of Aalsmeer 1974 to 1978
- Theodore van Houten (1952 in Aalsmeer – 2016) a Dutch-British writer, journalist and radio-theatre producer
- Peter R. de Vries (born 1956 in Aalsmeer – July 15, 2021) a Dutch investigative journalist and crime reporter
- Pieter Litjens (born 1968) a Dutch politician, Mayor of Aalsmeer 2007 to 2012

=== Sport ===
- IJke Buisma (1907 in Aalsmeer – 1994) a Dutch high jumper, competed in the 1928 Summer Olympics
- Jan Bol (1924 in Aalsmeer – 2010) a Dutch sailor who competed at the 1968 Summer Olympics
- Jan Jongkind (1932 in Aalsmeer – 2024) a sailor who competed at the 1964 Summer Olympics
- Piet Bon (1946 in Aalsmeer – 2010) a retired Dutch rower, competed at the 1968 Summer Olympics
- Michael Buskermolen (born 1972) a Dutch retired footballer with 399 club caps with AZ Alkmaar, lives in Kudelstaart
- David Pel (born 1991 in Aalsmeer) a Dutch tennis player
