= Joost Hoffscholte =

Dutch politician (born 1942)

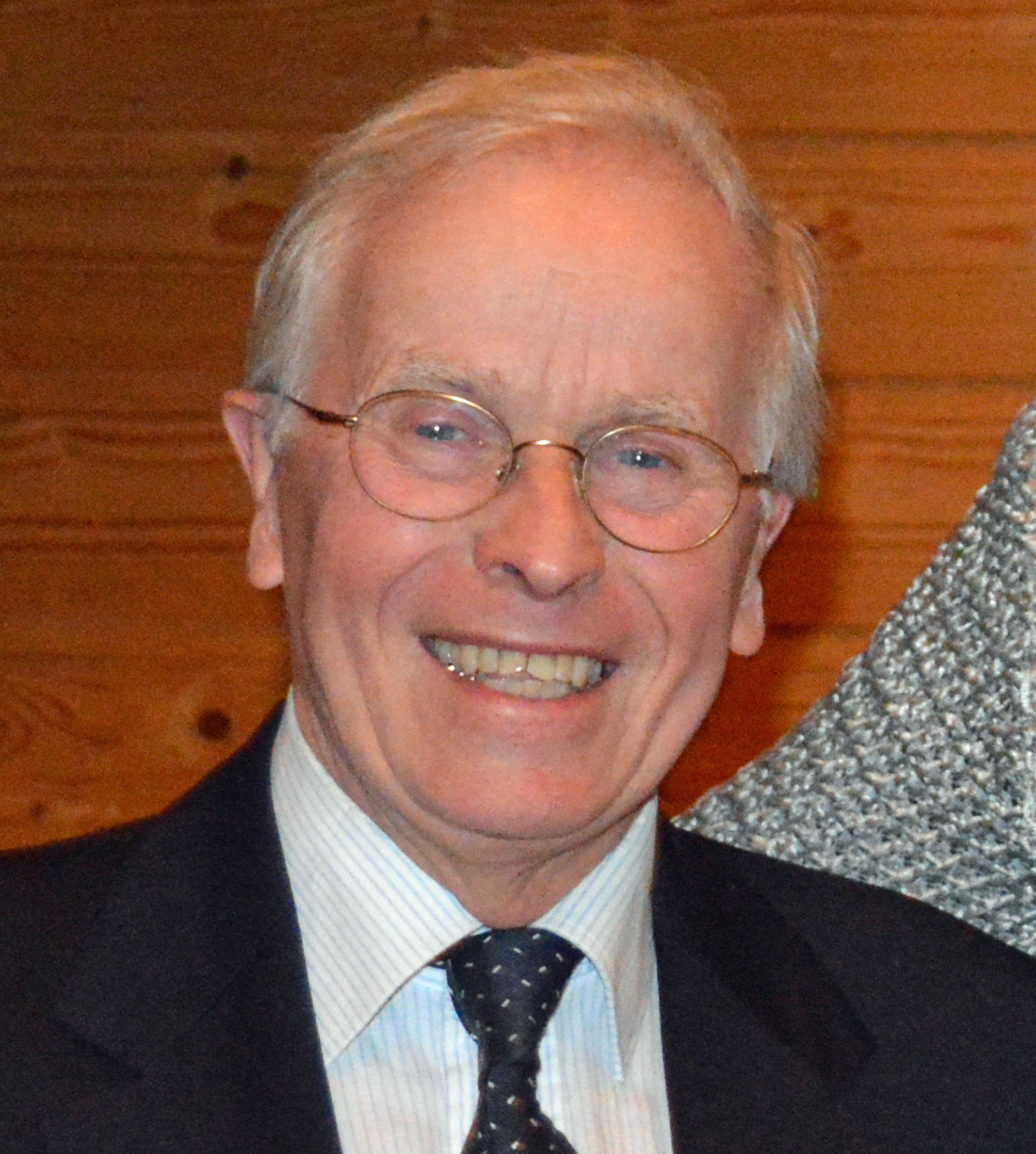

Mayor of Aalsmeer
- In office 25 June 1985 – 1 September 2007
- Preceded by: Leo Brouwer
- Succeeded by: Pieter Litjens

Mayor of Dalen
- In office 1 October 1977 – 25 June 1985
- Preceded by: Ivo Opstelten
- Succeeded by: Nico Meerburg

Personal details
- Born: Joseph Ignatius Maria Hoffscholte; 31 August 1942 (age 84) Amsterdam, Netherlands
- Party: People's Party for Freedom and Democracy
- Spouse(s): Maud Maria Leontine van Boven (m. 1971–1975; her death); Miekje Spoelder (m. 1977)
- Children: 3 children
- Education: University of Amsterdam (Bachelor of Laws, Master of Laws)
- Occupation: Politician; Civil servant Nonprofit director Jurist

Joseph Ignatius Maria "Joost" Hoffscholte (born 31 August 1942) is a retired Dutch politician of the People's Party for Freedom and Democracy (VVD). He served as Mayor of Dalen from 1 October 1977 until 25 June 1985 when he became Mayor of Aalsmeer serving from 25 June 1985 until 1 September 2007.
