= Westeinderplassen =

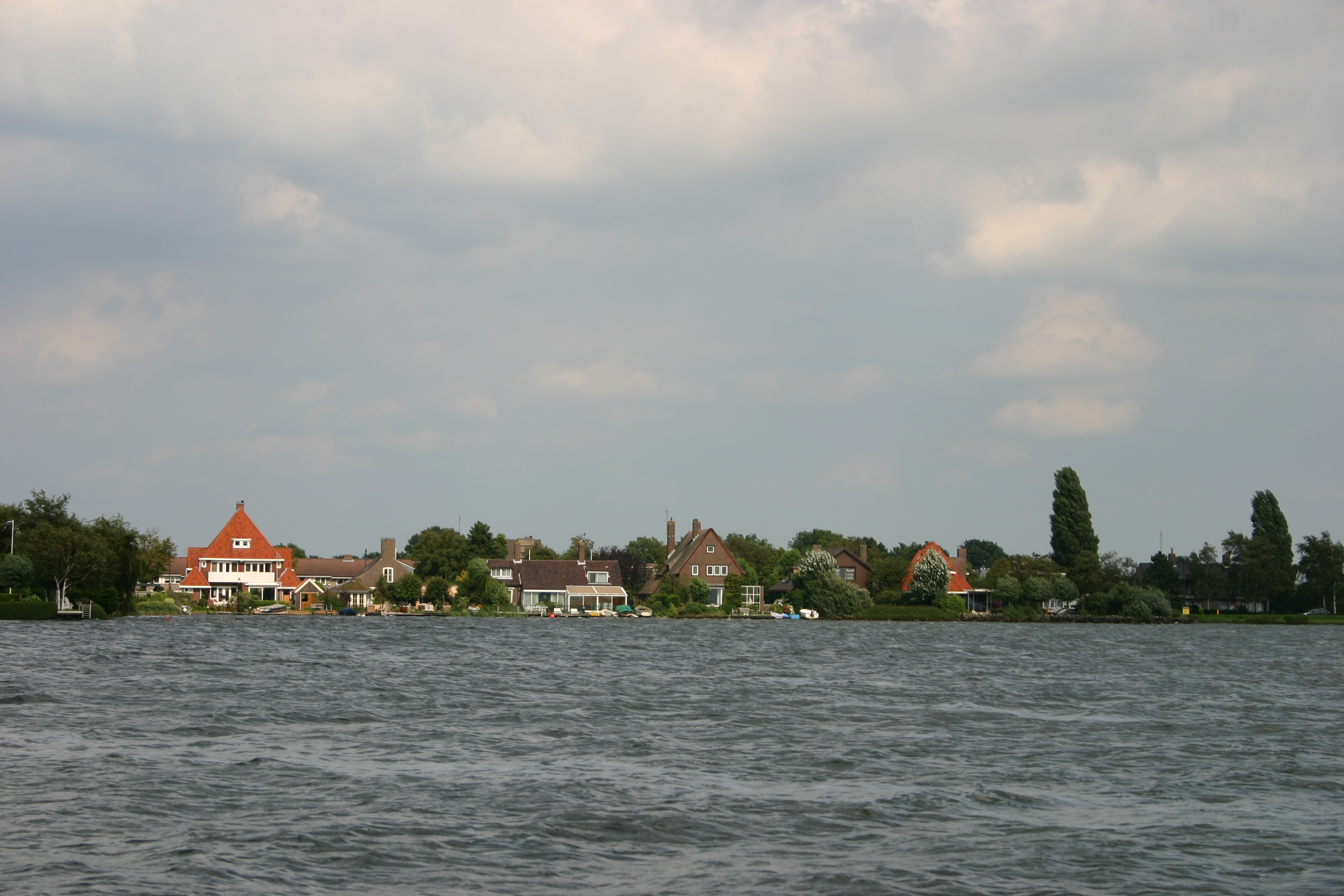
- Westeinderplassen

- Location within North Holland
- Location: Aalsmeer, Netherlands
- Coordinates: 52°15′N 4°44′E
- Type: lake
- Surface area: 10 square kilometres (2,500 acres)

The Westeinderplassen ("West End Lakes") are a complex of lakes belonging mostly to the territory of Aalsmeer, Netherlands. Their total area is about 10 square kilometres (2,500 acres)^{2}, making it the largest freshwater body of water in the Randstad area.

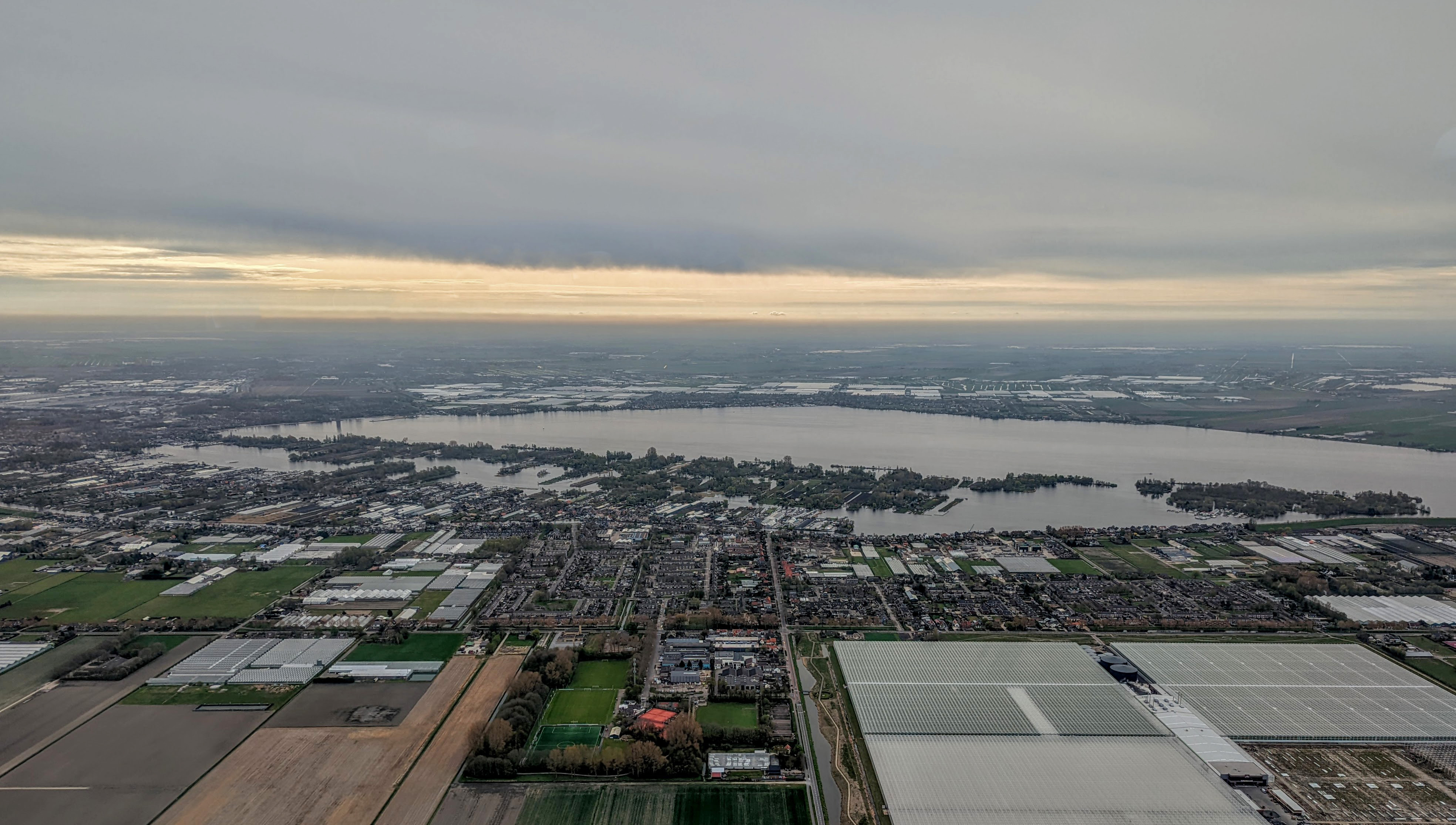
Westeinderplassen aerial view from the northwest, on takeoff from Schiphol

== Geography ==
Towns situated on the lakefront include Aalsmeer, Kudelstaart, Burgerveen, Leimuiden, and Rijsenhout.

The northern part in particular contains hundreds of small islands. Many of these are privately owned and can only be reached by boat.

== Economy ==
The northwestern part of the lakes connect directly to the Ringvaart, which sees significant commercial shipping. The bulk of the lakes, though, are used mostly for recreational boating.
