= Calslagen =

- Hamlet
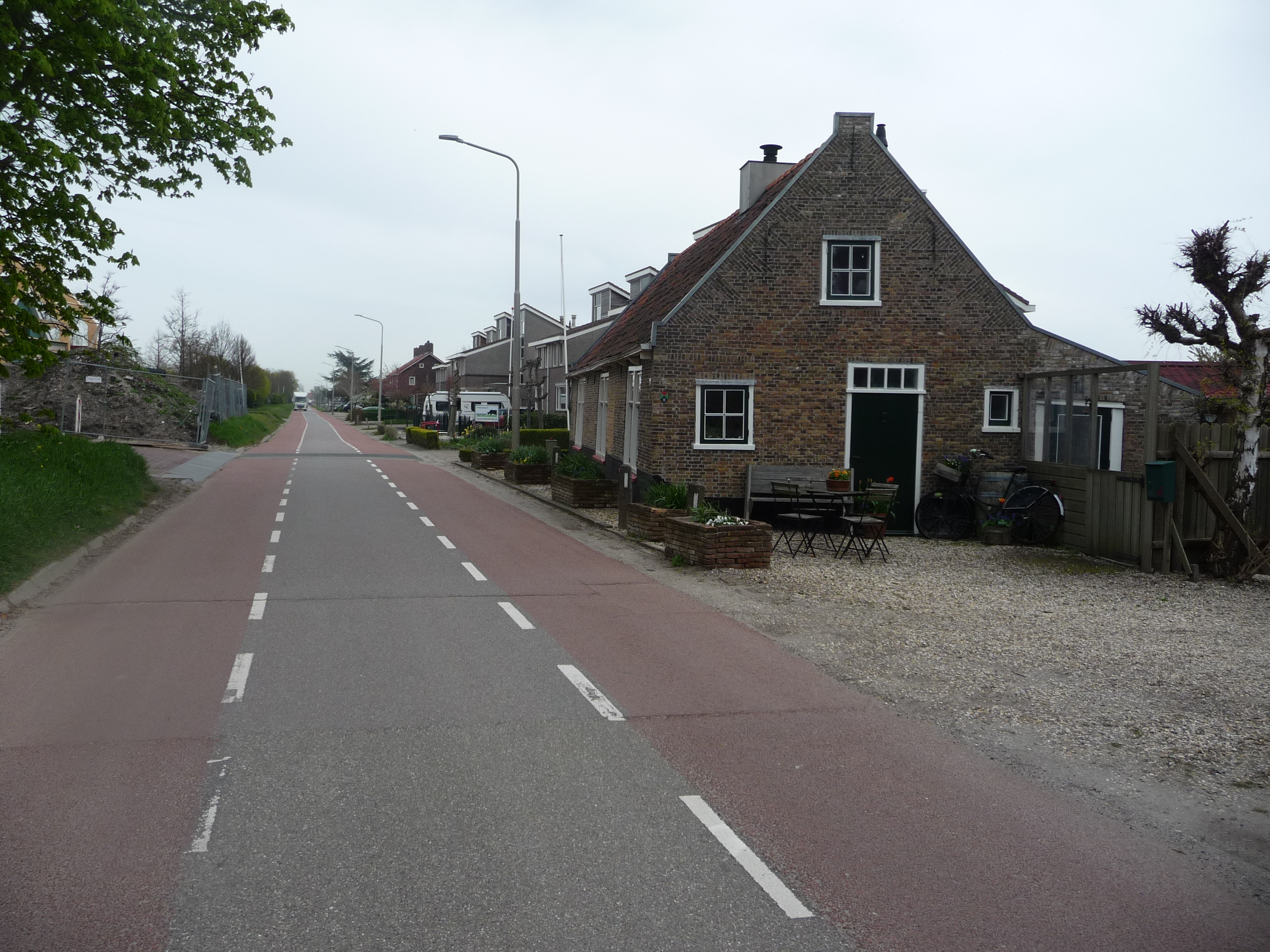
- Street view

- Location in the Netherlands Location in the province of North Holland in the Netherlands
- Coordinates: 52°14′00″N 4°43′51″E
- Country: Netherlands
- Province: North Holland
- Municipality: Aalsmeer
- Time zone: UTC+1 (CET)
  - Summer (DST): UTC+2 (CEST)
- Postal code: 1433
- Dialing code: 0297

Calslagen is a hamlet in the Dutch province of North Holland. It is a part of the municipality of Aalsmeer, and lies about 9 km south of Hoofddorp.

Until 1854, Calslagen (then spelled "Kalslagen") was a separate municipality, under the name of Kalslagen en Bilderdam.

Calslagen is not a statistical entity, and the postal authorities have placed it under Kudelstaart. Calslagen has place name signs. It was home to 33 people in 1840. Nowadays it consists of about 35 houses and about 10 house boats.
