= Royal De Vries =

The first De Vries shipyard was started in Aalsmeer in The Netherlands by Chris de Vries. His sons Henk and Johan started a yacht-building shipyard nearby in 1923, and these two were among the original founders of Feadship in 1949. The history of Feadship is detailed in the referenced article. In 2006, at the 100th anniversary of the yard, De Vries received the "Royal" designation and now calls itself Koninklijke De Vries Scheepsbouw. The yard has capacity to build up to three yachts a year, sizes ranging from 39 metres to 100 metres length overall. The company is owned by five family shareholders and operates two shipyards (the original one in Aalsmeer, and a large shipyard in Makkum acquired in 2005), one steel yard, one aluminum/manufacturing company and two engineering firms and one interior/furniture making facility. In 2017, the group employs over 1,000 people in The Netherlands.
