= Pieter Litjens =

Dutch politician

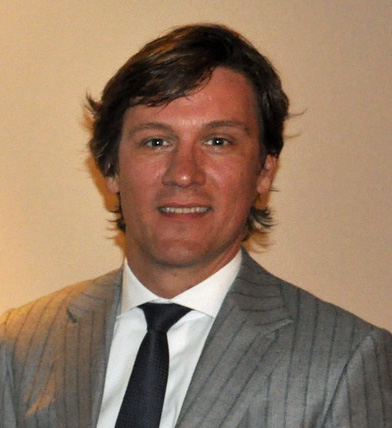

Member of the House of Representatives of the Netherlands
- In office 20 September 2012 – 25 June 2014

Mayor of Aalsmeer
- In office 15 August 2007 – 20 September 2012
- Preceded by: Joost Hoffscholte
- Succeeded by: Theo van Eijk

Personal details
- Born: Pieter Jan Marie Litjens; 17 May 1968 (age 58) Utrecht, Netherlands
- Party: People's Party for Freedom and Democracy
- Spouse: Saskia Rill
- Children: Joep; Teun; Neeltje
- Education: University of Amsterdam (Master of Science)
- Occupation: Politician; Political consultant
- Website: Official site

Pieter Jan Marie Litjens (born 17 May 1968) is a Dutch politician of the People's Party for Freedom and Democracy (VVD). He is an Alderman in Amsterdam since 18 June 2014.

Litjens previously served as an Alderman for the Amsterdam borough Zuidoost from April 2002 until August 2006. He was selected as the Mayor of Aalsmeer serving from 15 August 2007 until 20 September 2012 when he was elected as a Member of the House of Representatives of the Netherlands after the Dutch general election of 2012. After the Dutch municipal elections of 2014 he became an Alderman in Amsterdam on 18 June 2014.

== Biography ==
=== Early life ===
Pieter Jan Marie Litjens was born on 17 May 1968 in Utrecht in the Netherlands Province of Utrecht.

He studied French at the Vrije Universiteit Amsterdam from 1988 to 1991, when he changed majors to political science at the University of Amsterdam and graduated in 1996 with a Master of Science degree.

He worked for the VNO-NCW from 1996 to 1999 when he became the political advisor of the alderman for Economic Affairs of Amsterdam, serving until 2002.

=== Politics ===
In April 2002 he became an Alderman for the Amsterdam-Zuidoost borough, dealing with finance, economic affairs, sports and recreation, environmental management and personnel and organization. He stepped down in 2006 and was elected mayor of Aalsmeer the following year, taking office on 15 August 2007.

He was candidate for the House of Representatives during the Dutch general election of 2012. He was elected on 12 September 2012 and left mayoralty of Aalsmeer the same day he has taken office as an MP.

Litjens became alderman in Amsterdam on 18 June 2014, he resigned in the House of Representatives on 25 June and was replaced by Hayke Veldman.

Political offices
Preceded by Joost Hoffscholte	Mayor of Aalsmeer; 2007–2012	Succeeded by Theo van Eijk
