= Thamen =

Former village in the Netherlands

Coordinates: 52.236237°N 4.839832°E

Thamen is a former village in the Dutch province of North Holland. It was located north of Uithoorn.

Thamen was a separate municipality until 1820, when it was merged with Uithoorn. Until 1819 both Thamen and Uithoorn were municipalities of the province of Utrecht.
