= Chemische Industrie Uithoorn =

Dutch chemical company

Coordinates: 52.23981°N 4.84291°E

Chemische Industrie Uithoorn (Cindu) later Cindu Chemicals BV
- Industry: Chemical
- Predecessor: Teerbedrijf Uithoorn (TEBU) (1922–1952); Teerunie (1952–1959)
- Founded: 1922, as Teerbedrijf Uithoorn
- Founder: J.A. van Seumeren
- Successor: Koppers Netherlands BV (2010–)
- Headquarters: Uithoorn, Netherlands
- Products: Coal tar derivatives
- Revenue: €50 million (2008)
- Number of employees: 122

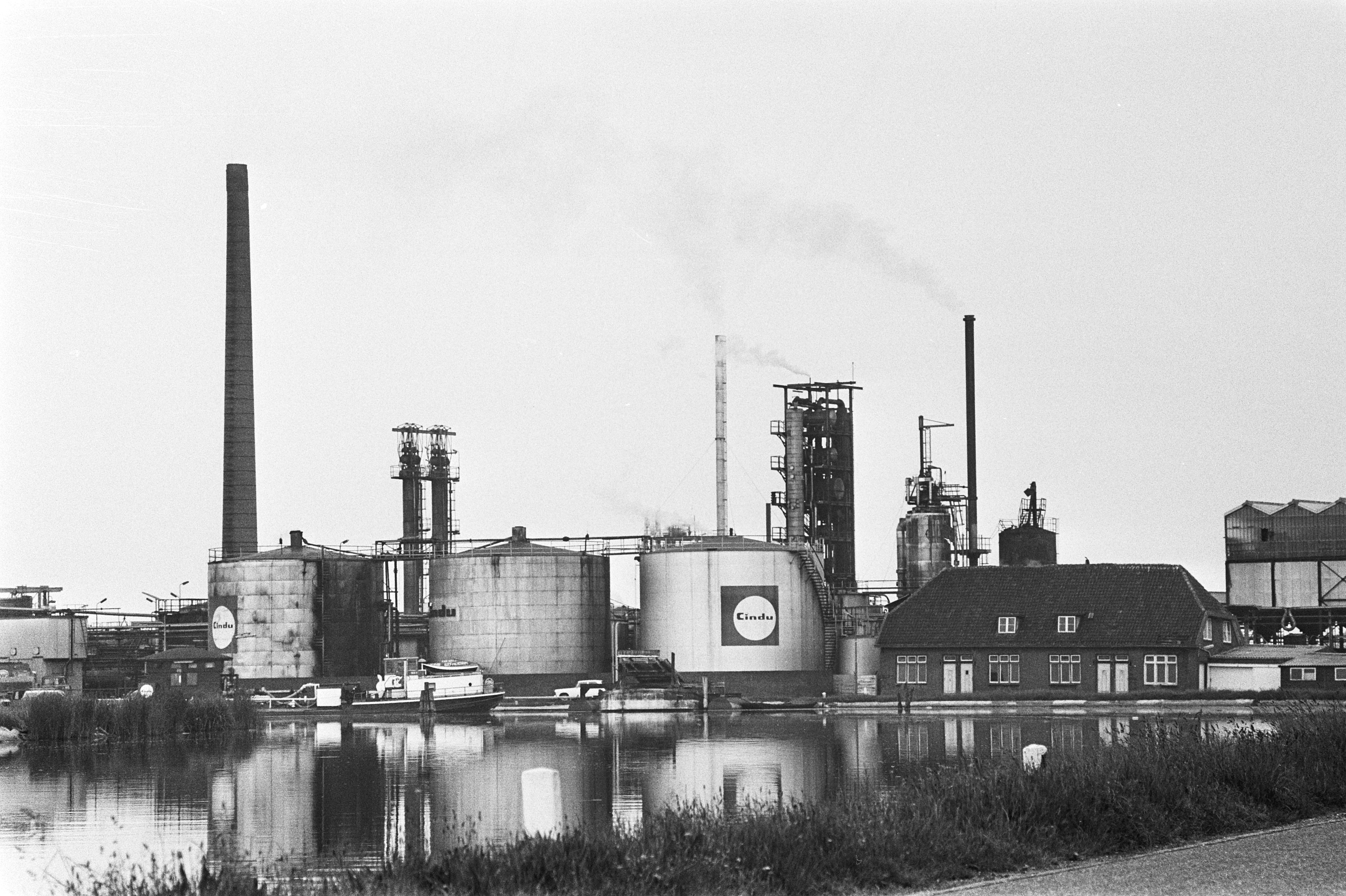
Part of the Cindu factory (1971)

Chemische Industrie Uithoorn (Cindu, later Cindu Chemicals) was a chemical company in Uithoorn, Netherlands, specialising in processing coal tar. The company was founded in 1922 as Teerbedrijf Uithoorn (TEBU), and operated under a number of company names. It was acquired by Koppers in 2010 and renamed Koppers Netherlands.

A subsidiary producing polymers from tar derived chemicals was formed in 1960 as Neville Cindu Chemie (later Nevcin Polymers) and operated from the same site in Uithoorn. A reactor at the factory exploded in 1992, causing three deaths and several injuries.

Cindu ceased operations in 2014.

== History ==
Industrial chemical activity in Uithoorn dates to at least 1863; the Koninklijke Chemische Fabriek produced primarily sulphuric acid at the site. The company was acquired by rival sulphuric acid producer Ketjen en Co. (Note: Ketjen, founded by Gerhard Tileman Ketjen; one of the predecessor companies of AKZO.) who concentrated their manufacturing capacity in Amsterdam. The plant in Uithoorn closed, and was sold for demolition in 1916. In 1922, the factory was acquired by J.A. van Seumeren who created a tar processing facility under the company Teerbedrijf Uithoorn (TEBU). Koninklijke Hoogovens acquired a stake in the company in 1927.

In 1952/3, the company merged with the Utrechtsche Asphaltfabriek NV in 1952 to form Teerunie NV, in 1959, the company was renamed Chemische Industrie Uithoorn (CINDU). In 1953, a sales subsidiary (TEBU France) was established in France in 1953. (sold to the van Dijk family 1979, and now tebu-bio).

During the 1970s, pollution from in the Uithoorn area became a major source for public concern — Cindu was a major polluter. A public group werkgroep Cindroom was formed by concerned residents of Uithoorn. During the 1970s, new environmental protection laws were introduced in the Netherlands, including air quality, and odor nuisance regulations. Before emission control mechanisms were introduced the Cindu plant was estimated to emit ~200t per year into the air. Discharges causing water pollution also exceeded standards, which the company could not realistically meet; exceptions to discharge limits were granted to 1988 whilst the company and authorities sought solutions.

In 1991, the Cindu group (including subsidiaries) employed over 1700 of which over 500 were employed in Uithorn including about 120 at the Nevcin joint venture.

Cindu's parent holding company Cindu International NV (formerly named Cindu — Key & Kramer NV) owned interests in a number of other companies, Cindu International was split up in 1997, and delisted 1999. The coal tar activities at Uithoorn continued after 1997 as Cindu Chemicals, (50% owned by Koninklijke Hoogovens), as well as the joint venture Nevcin Polymers.

In 1992, three people died after an explosion at the factory. In 2001, a storage tank for Naphthalene cracked; the resultant odor brought complaints about the odor of (moth balls), which was reported as far away as England.

The plant was sold to Koppers Inc. in 2010, and ceased operations in 2014.

=== Joint ventures and subsidiaries ===
==== Nevcin ====
Neville Cindu Chemie was founded in 1959 as a 50:50 joint venture located in Uithorn, between Cindu International and Neville Chemical. The company manufactured organic resins. The company was renamed Nevcin Polymers in 1984.

On 8 July 1992, an overheating vessel at the Nevcin site exploded, resulting in a fire; three people were killed and eleven wounded. The accident was caused by the reaction vessel being wrongly filled with the reactive chemical Dicyclopentadiene the previous day.

In 1999, Neville chemicals became sole owner of the company. The company was renamed Neville Chemical Europe BV from the beginning of 2003. In October 2011, the company was sold to Resinall Rutgers Resins (Germany).

==== TTS ====
Tanker Transport Services BV (TTS) was established in 1965; it was the water transportation subsidiary of Cindu, operating tanker barges. It became a separate company in 2002, through a management buyout.

== Products ==
=== Cindu chemicals ===
In 2007, Cindu's output included Naphthalene, Creosote, Carbon black and Pitch used for the production of carbon electrodes, and also bitumen emulsions for road construction.

The primary process carried out the site was by distillation at 350C, in addition to further purification processes. The primary source of raw material (tar) was Koninklijke Hoogovens, tar from the plant was shipped by barge to Uithoorn.

As of 2012, the plant had a capacity to process 140000t of tar per year.

=== Nevcin ===
Nevcin synthesises hydrocarbon resins, using distillates from cracking of the naphtha fraction, with polymerisation feedstock including isoprene, piperylene and cyclopentadiene (or dicyclopentadiene dimer) as well as styrene and styrene-type products including vinyltoluene, indene, methylindene and alpha-methylstyrene. Resins derived from Coumarone (Benzofuran) and indene are also produced.
