= Uithoorn =

- Municipality
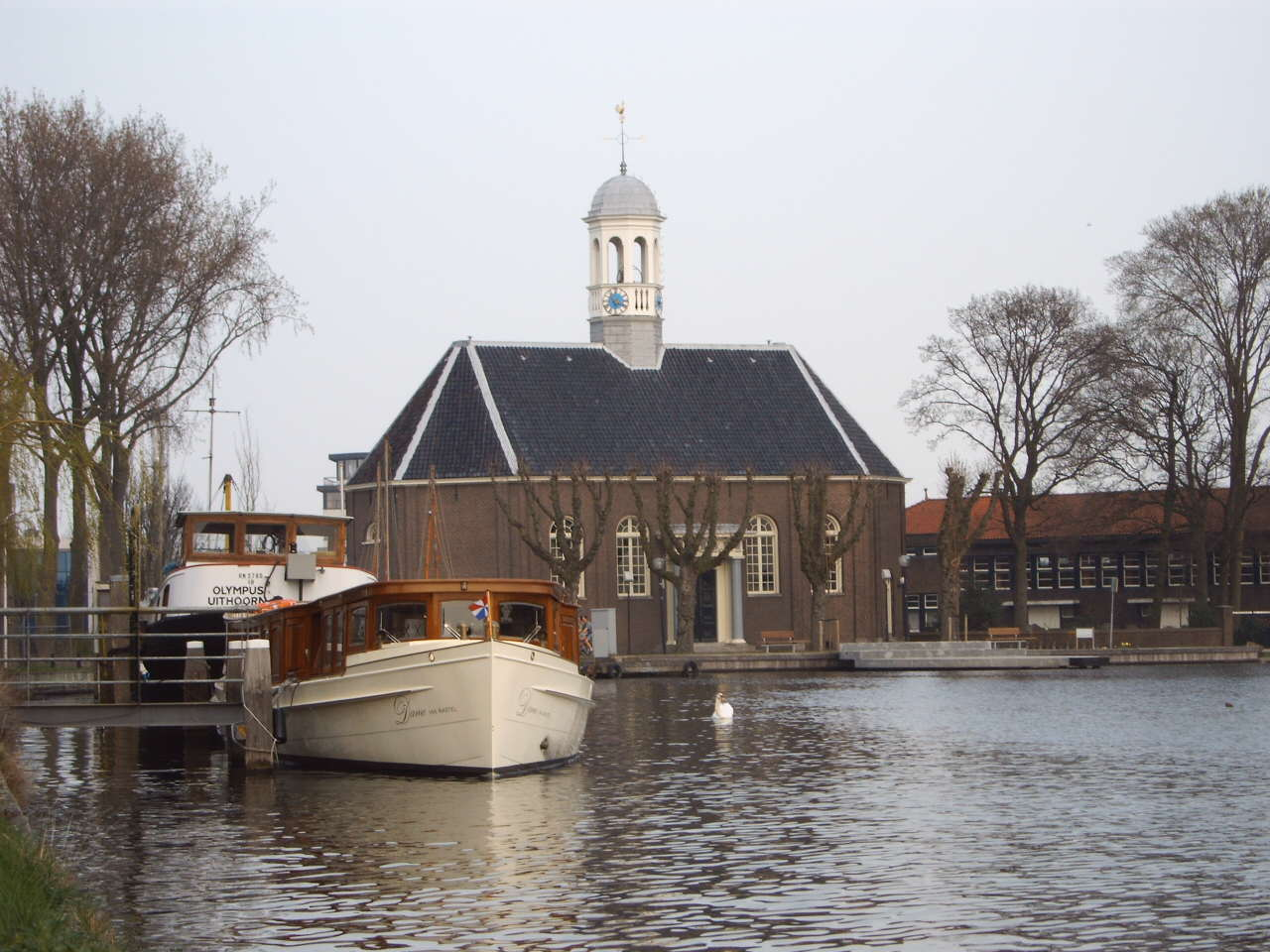
- Church in Uithoorn

- Flag Coat of arms

- Location in North Holland
- Coordinates: 52°14′N 4°50′E
- Country: Netherlands
- Province: North Holland

Government
  - Body: Municipal council
  - Mayor: Pieter Heiliegers (VVD)

Area
  - Total: 19.42 km^{2} (7.50 sq mi)
  - Land: 18.14 km^{2} (7.00 sq mi)
  - Water: 1.28 km^{2} (0.49 sq mi)
- Elevation: −1 m (−3.3 ft)

Population (January 2021)
  - Total: 30,206
  - Density: 1,665/km^{2} (4,310/sq mi)
- Demonym: Uithoornaar
- Time zone: UTC+1 (CET)
  - Summer (DST): UTC+2 (CEST)
- Postcode: 1420–1424
- Area code: 0297
- Website: www.uithoorn.nl

Uithoorn (Dutch pronunciation: [œytˈɦoːr(ə)n]) is a municipality and a town in the Netherlands, in the province of North Holland.

== Population centres ==
The municipality of Uithoorn includes the town of Uithoorn and the village of De Kwakel.

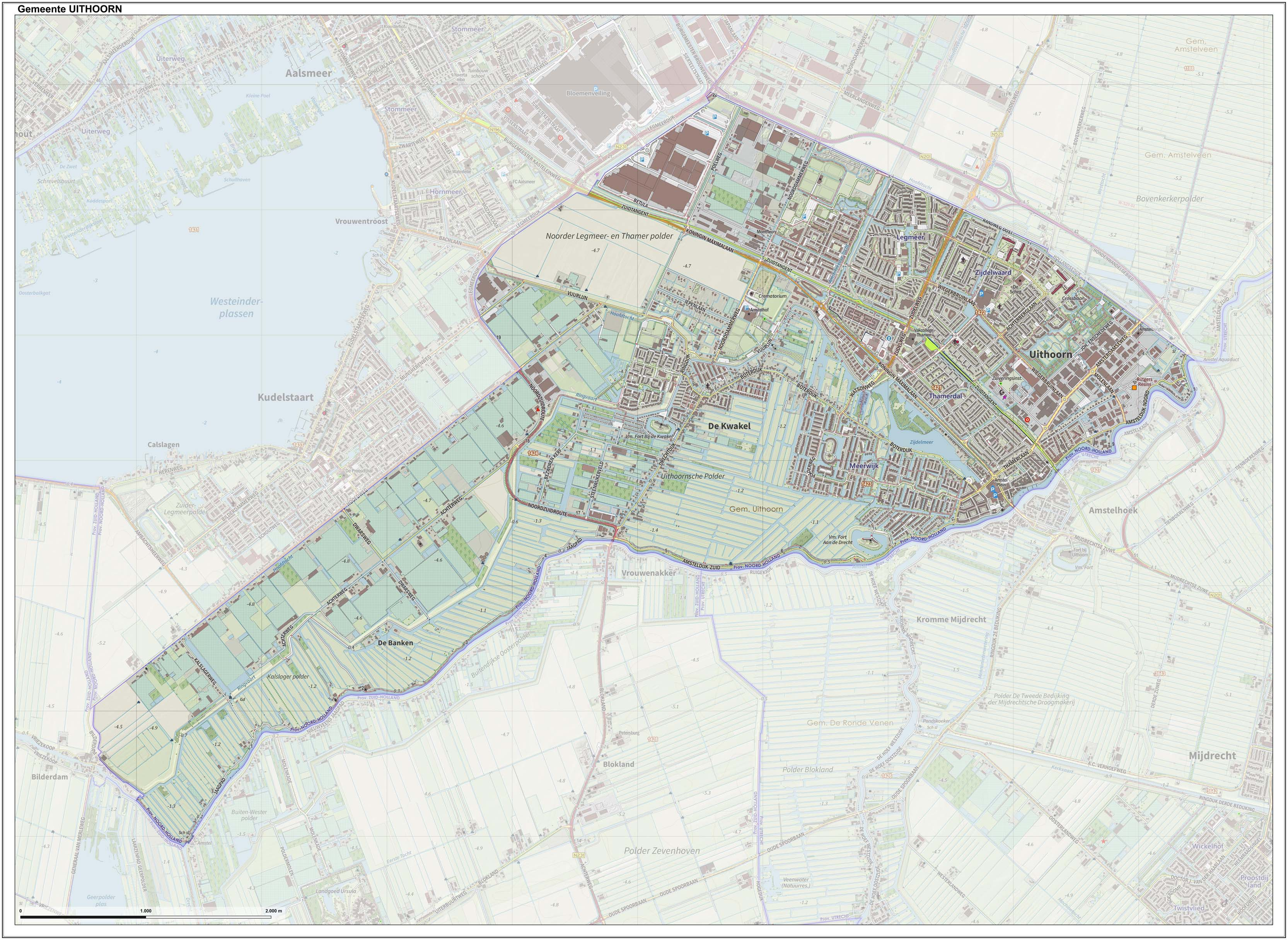
Map of the municipality of Uithoorn, June 2015

== History ==
The name De Uithoorn (or De Uythoorn) was used at the end of the Middle Ages for the location of the lower courts of the deanery of Saint John. The village formed around its courthouse.

People depended on agriculture and animal husbandry. Agriculture became increasingly more difficult due to the steady soil subsidence. From c. 1600 on, peat extraction became important and resulted in the formation of large ponds, which in turn would be made into polders later on.

During the Franco-Dutch War in the "disaster year" of 1672, Uithoorn was on the front lines and fortifications were built.

During the Batavian Republic period, the neighbouring village of Thamen was merged with Uithoorn. Its economy was limited, but improved in the middle of the 19th century when some industries (including chemical) were established in the area. The reclamation of a few large ponds provided extra agricultural land at the end of the same century.

A sulphuric acid plant was established on the banks of the Amstel in 1863, it closed in the early 1900s; in 1922 the site was used for a coal tar processor, Teerbedrijf Uithoorn, later known as Cindu Chemicals. A subsidiary company Nevcin Polymers also operated on the site: both companies were major employers in the town, and also polluters of the air and water bodies. In 1992 a reactor at the Nevcin site exploded, causing three deaths and several injuries. As of 2012 both plants remain in operation.

In circa 1885, several fortifications were built around Uithoorn as part of the Stelling van Amsterdam.

In 1915, the Bovenkerk – Uithoorn line of the former Haarlemmermeer railway lines reached Uithoorn, near the village centre on the Amstel. Passenger service would end in 1950 and freight service in 1972. Most of the line was scrapped by 1987. The former Uithoorn railway station still stands. Later a busway would be built on part of the abandoned right-of-way. Tram line 25 (dubbed the Amsteltram) would be extended along the right-of-way opening in 2024.

After World War II, Uithoorn developed quickly: in 1948 the Thamerdal neighbourhood was built, followed by Zijdelwaard in 1960, Legmeer in 1972, Meerwijk-West and Meerwijk-Oost from 1985 on. In 1991 a new shopping centre was built in the town centre, at the expense of many original buildings.

== Local government ==
The municipal council of Uithoorn consists of 23 seats, which at the 2026 municipal election divided as follows:

- VVD - 7 seats
- Gemeentebelangen - 6 seats
- DUS! (GroenLinks–D66) - 5 seats
- CDA - 4 seats
- PvdA - 1 seat

== Notable people ==
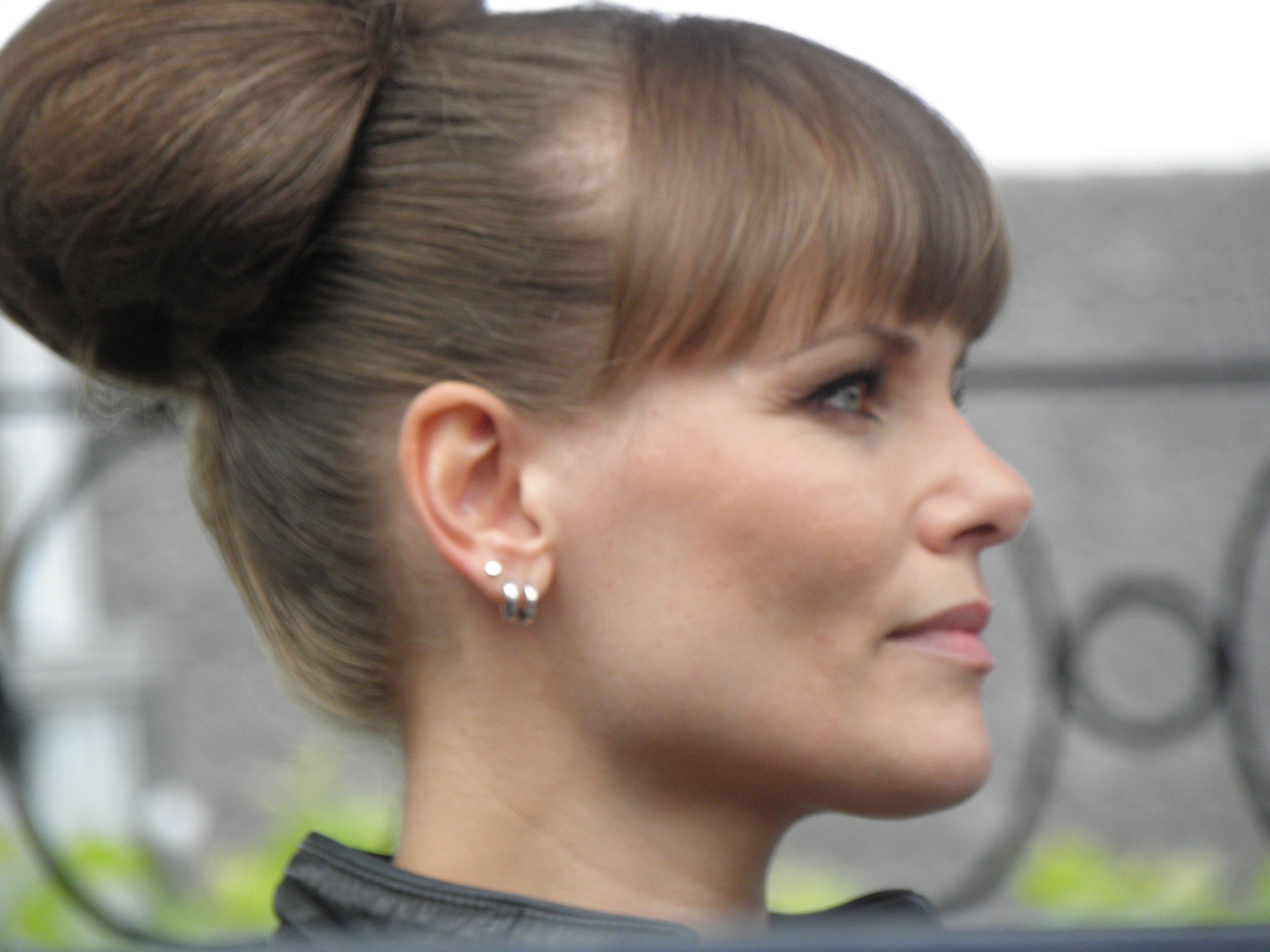
Angela Schijf, 2012

- Maarten van 't Kruijs (1813–1885) a chess player and organist
- Johannes Voorhout (1647–1717) a Dutch Golden Age painter
- Piet Steenkamp (1925–2016) a politician
- Hans Koeleman (born 1957) a retired Dutch middle- and long-distance runner, competed in the steeplechase at the 1984 and 1988 Summer Olympics
- Ruud Koopmans (born 1961) a sociologist and academic
- Angela Schijf (born 1979) an actress
- Lars Veldwijk (born 1991) a Dutch-born South African professional footballer with over 200 club caps

== Gallery ==
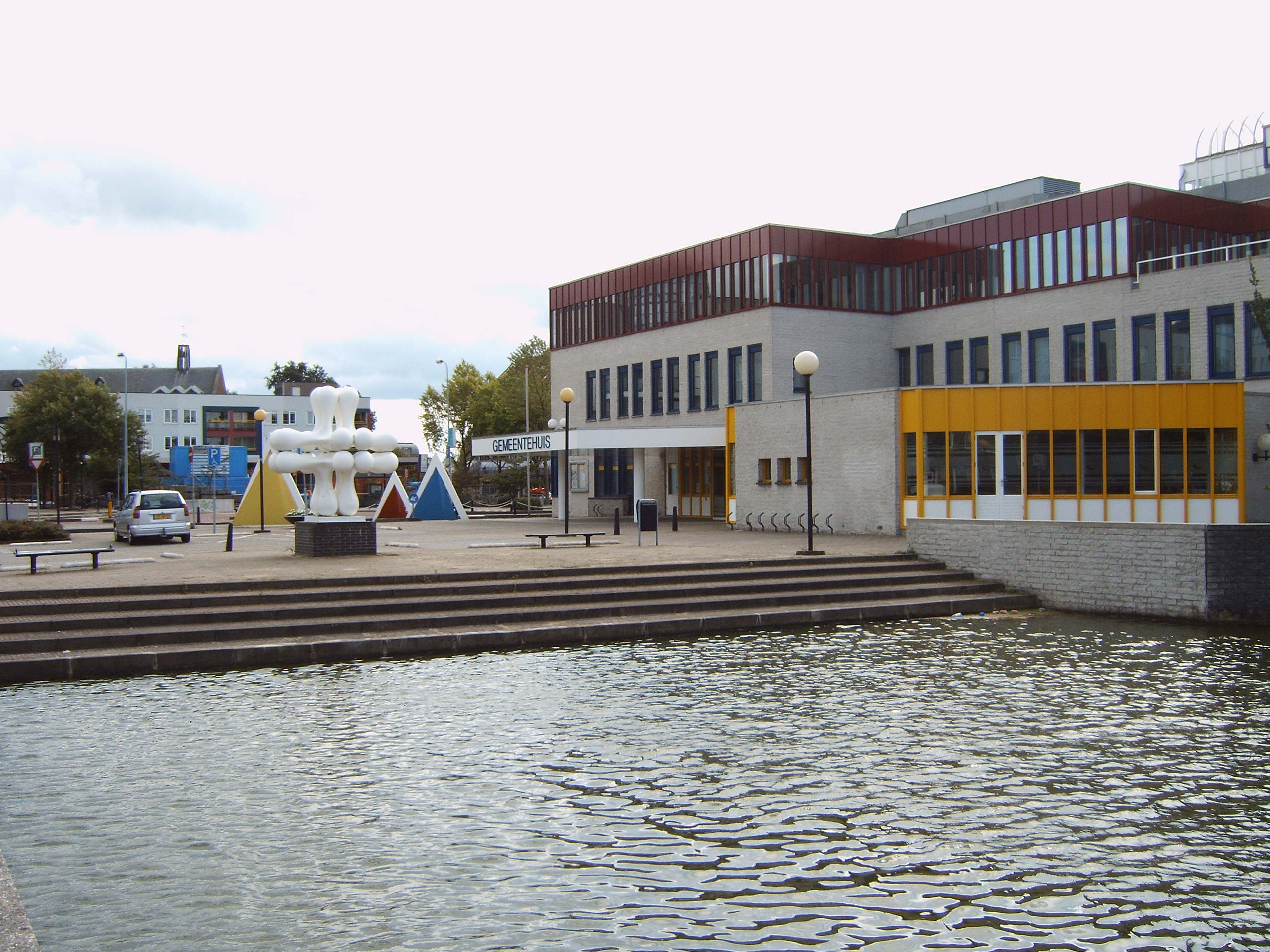
Uithoorn town hall

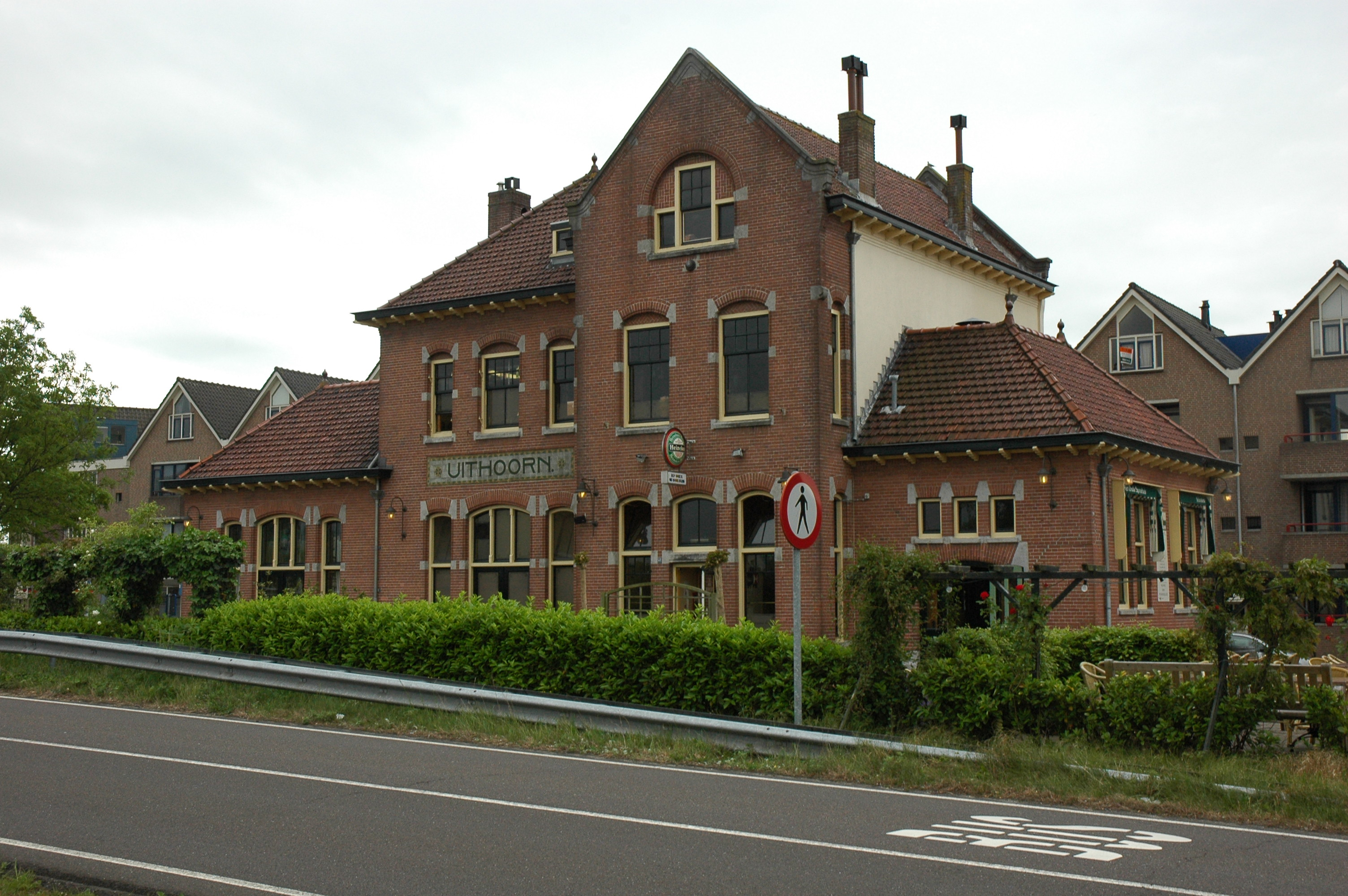
Former Uithoorn railway station

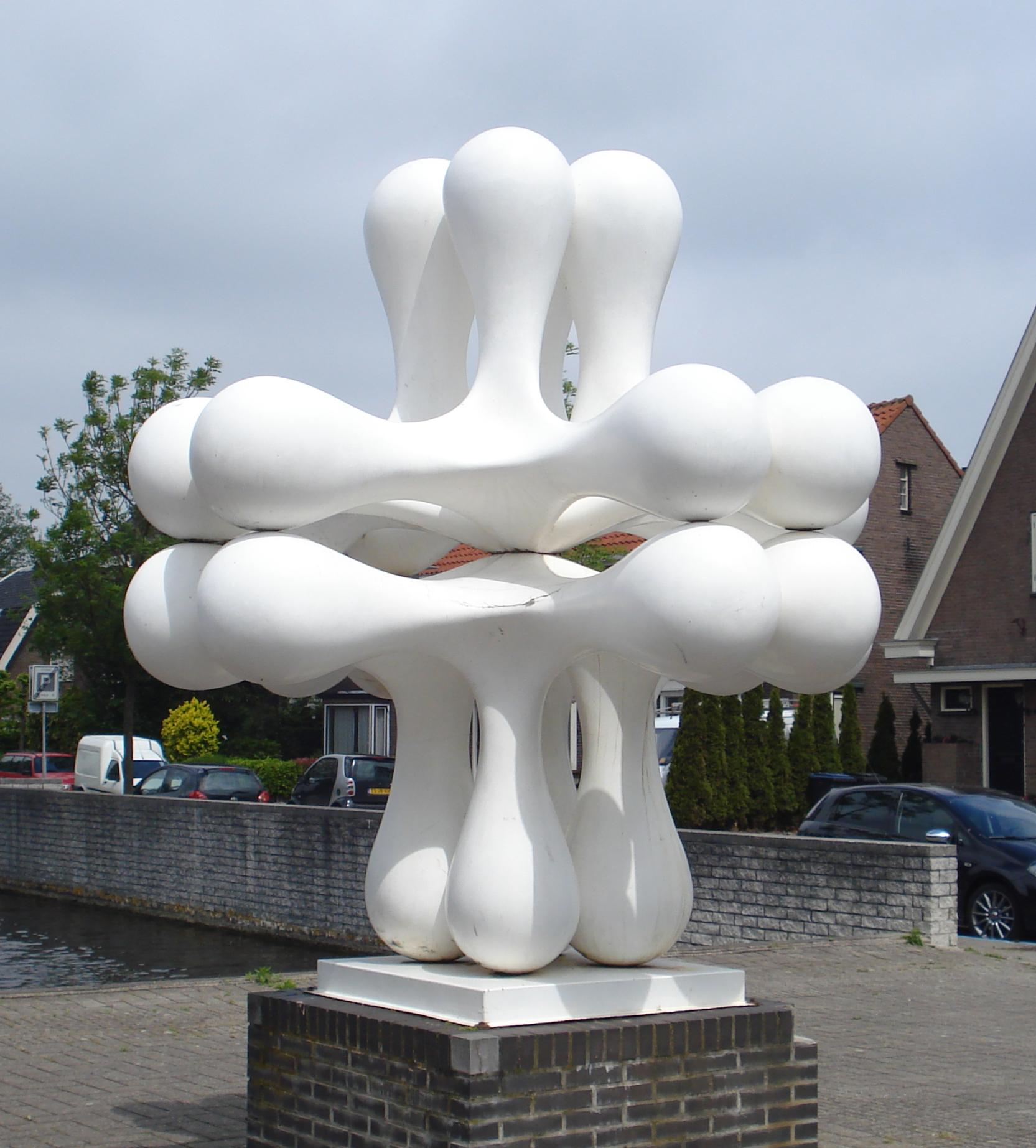
Amstelplein artwork, Uithoorn

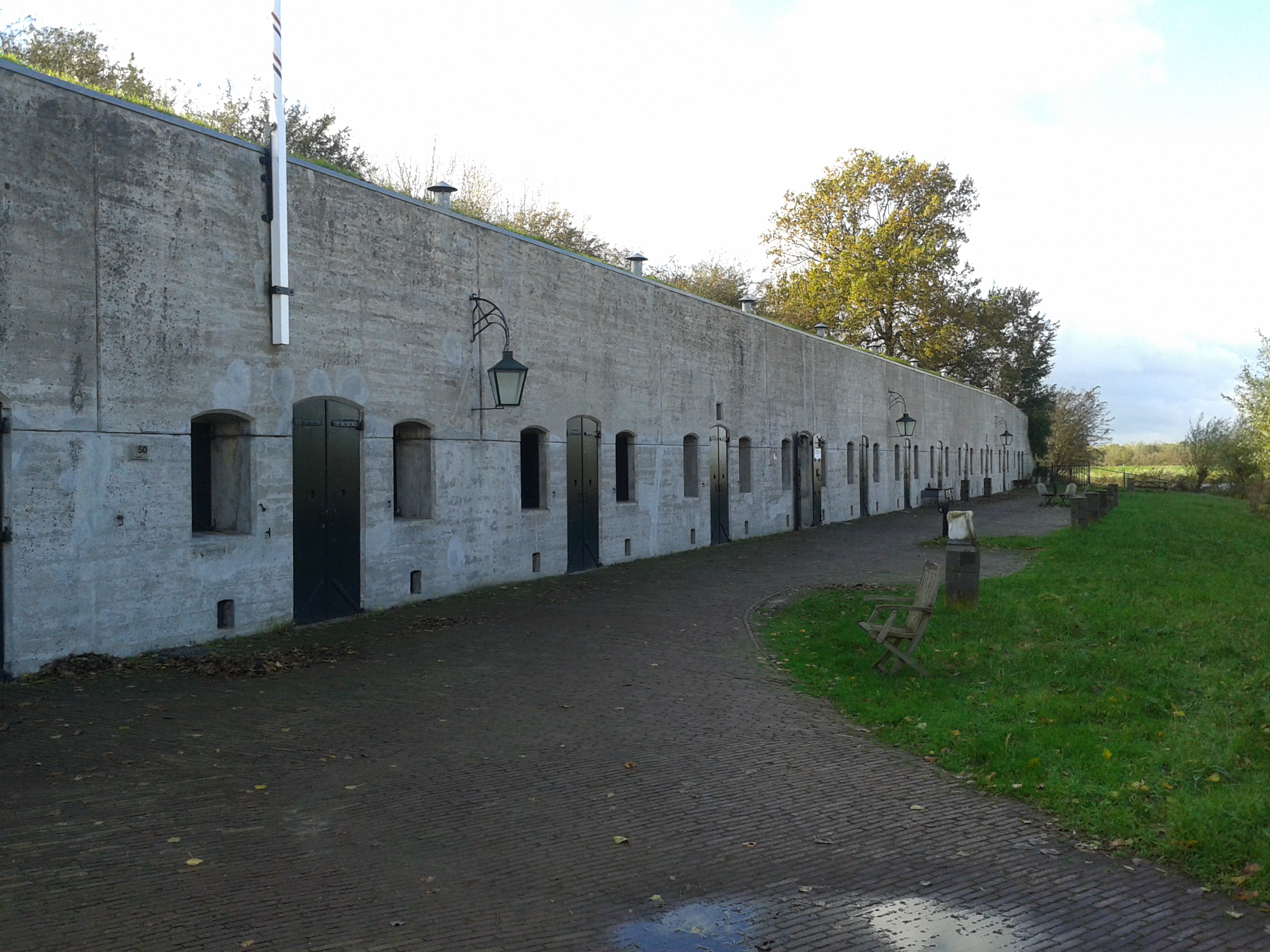
Fort aan de Drecht
