= Leimuiden =

- Village
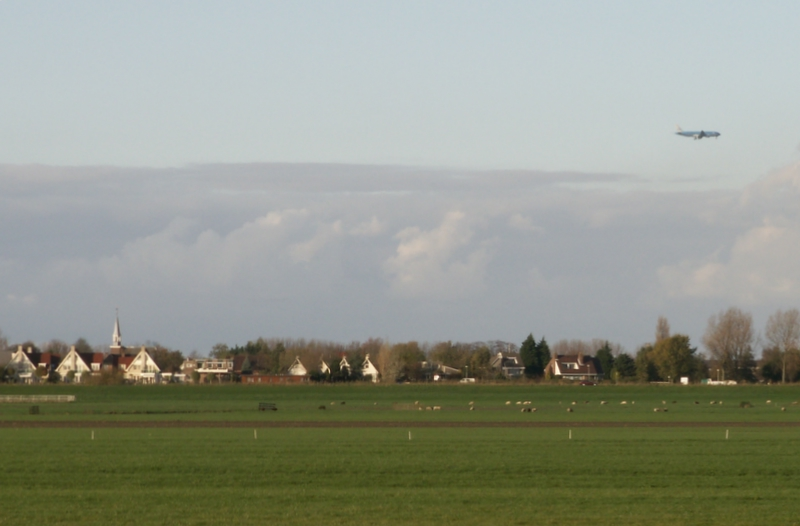
- View on Leimuiden

- Location in the province of South Holland in the Netherlands Location in the Netherlands
- Coordinates: 52°13′N 4°40′E
- Country: Netherlands
- Province: South Holland
- Municipality: Kaag en Braassem

Area
  - Total: 12.26 km^{2} (4.73 sq mi)
- Elevation: −0.5 m (−1.6 ft)

Population (2021)
  - Total: 4,500
  - Density: 370/km^{2} (950/sq mi)
- Time zone: UTC+1 (CET)
  - Summer (DST): UTC+2 (CEST)
- Postal code: 2451
- Dialing code: 0172
- Major roads: N207
- Website: www.leimuiden.nl

Leimuiden is a Dutch village in the South Holland municipality of Kaag en Braassem. Leimuiden is located between the Braassemermeer, the Westeinderplassen and the Ringvaart. Leimuiden is located north of Alphen aan den Rijn.

== History ==
The village was first mentioned in the first half of the 11th century as Letthemutha, and means "mouth of the Leiden river". Leimuiden is a peat excavation settlement from the Middle Ages.

The Dutch Reformed church is an aisleless church with built-in tower with needle spire. It was built in 1805 as a replacement of the 1555 church. It was restored between 1963 and 1965, and a consistory was added.

Leimuiden was home to 551 people in 1840. It was a separate municipality until 1991, when it became part of Jacobswoude. The village was part of North Holland until 1865. The village was bombed on 2 August 1940 by the Royal Air Force, because the Germans had established a local headquarters in Leimuiden. In 2009, it became part of the municipality of Kaag en Braassem.

The highest level surface of Leimuiden is located on provincial road N207, approximately level with NAP. The village "on the hill" (Noordeinde-Dokter Stapenséastraat-Burgemeester Bakhuizenlaan-Dorpsstraat) is approximately 0.5 meters below NAP. The depoldered areas are between 4.0 and 4.5 meters below NAP.

== Gallery ==
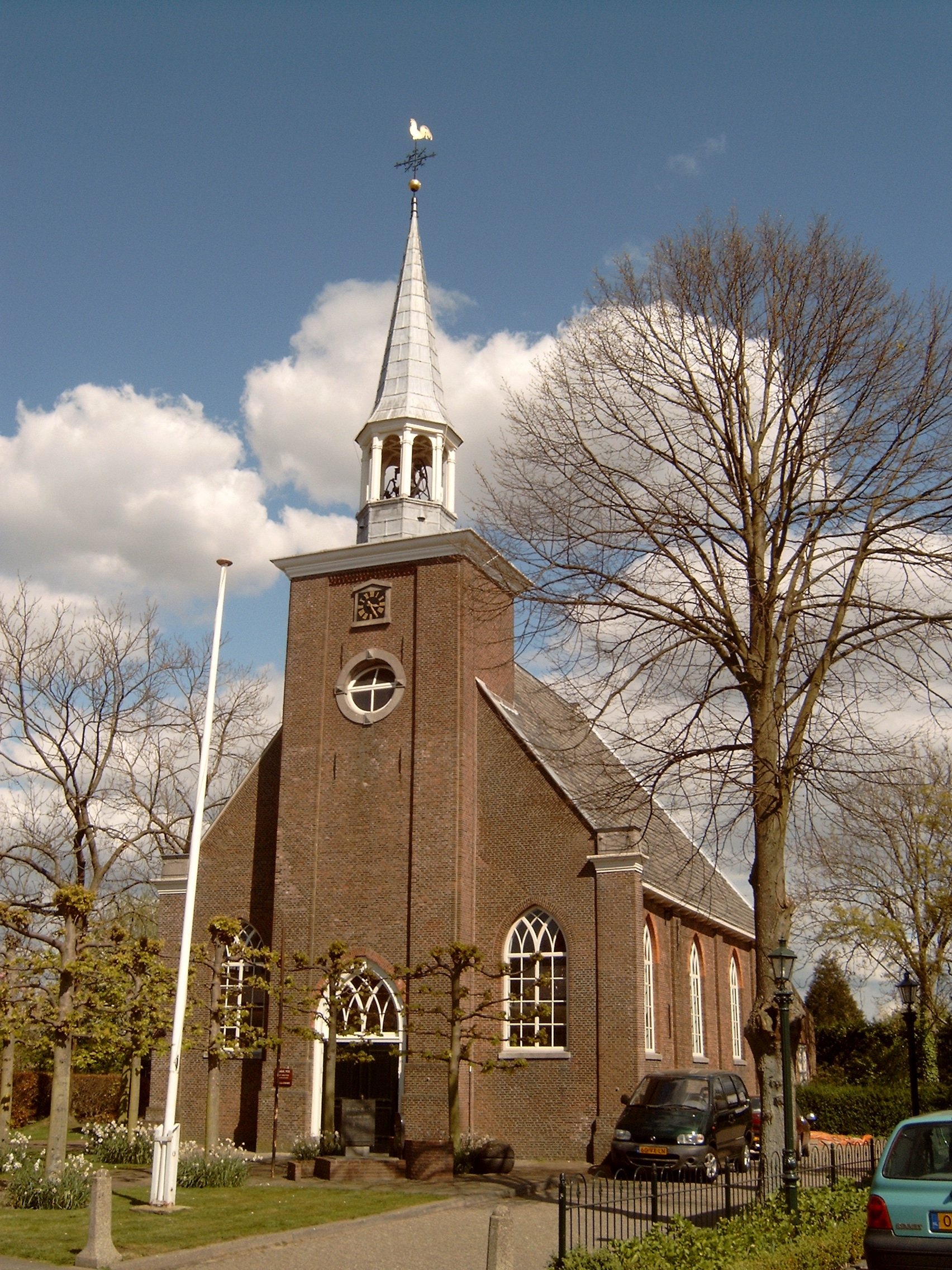
Leimuiden, church

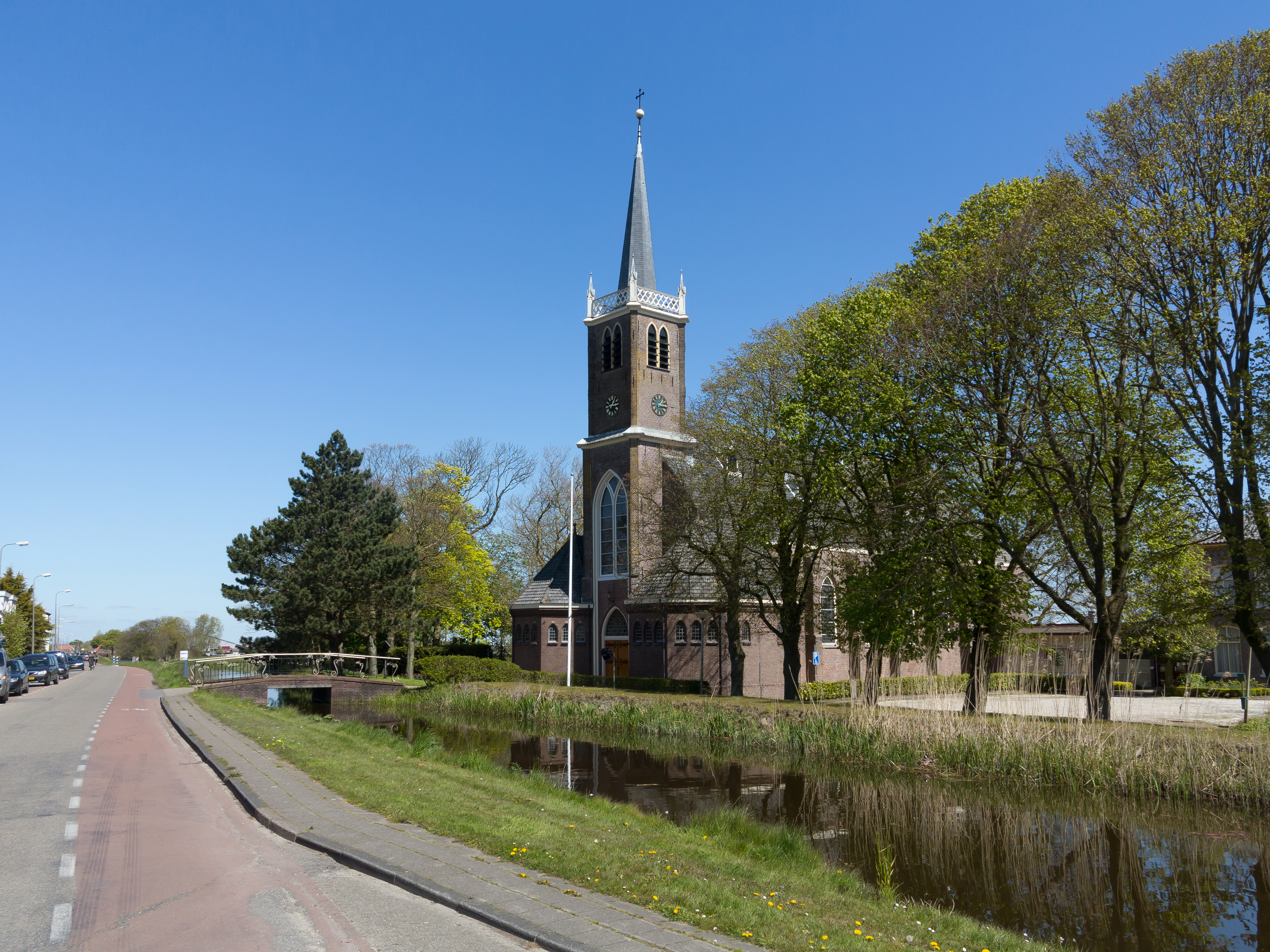
Leimuiden, church: de Johannes de Doperkerk

== See also ==
- Meerewijck, a marina neighbourhood in Leimuiden
