= Kudelstaart =

- Town
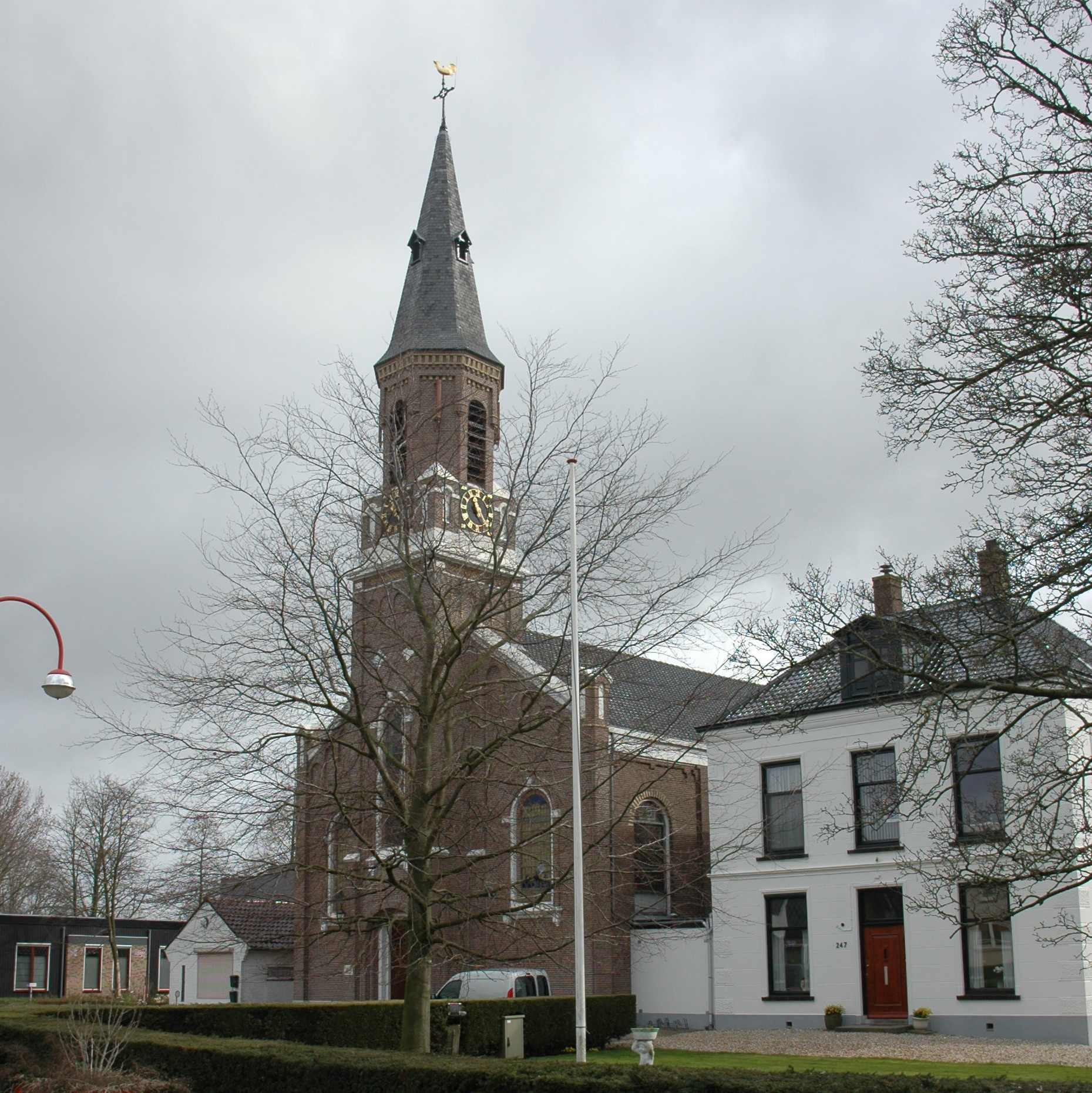
- View of the Roman Catholic church of Kudelstaart.

- Location in the Netherlands Location in the province of North Holland in the Netherlands
- Coordinates: 52°14′2″N 4°44′54″E
- Country: Netherlands
- Province: North Holland
- Municipality: Aalsmeer

Area
  - Total: 8.26 km^{2} (3.19 sq mi)
- Elevation: −0.2 m (−0.66 ft)

Population (2021)
  - Total: 9,250
  - Density: 1,120/km^{2} (2,900/sq mi)
- Time zone: UTC+1 (CET)
  - Summer (DST): UTC+2 (CEST)
- Postal code: 1431
- Dialing code: 0297

Kudelstaart is a town in the Dutch province of North Holland. It is a part of the municipality of Aalsmeer, and lies about 10 km southeast of Hoofddorp.

The village was first mentioned in 1237 as Sconedorpe. The current name is a combination of "fish net" and "long, thin piece of land". Kudelstaart developed around 1200 as a peat excavation settlement. In the 13th century, it was split between Holland and Utrecht. In 1724, the heerlijkheid was bought by the city of Amsterdam.

== Geography ==
Kudelstaart lies on the Westeinderplassen, a large complex of lakes.

== Economy ==
Like in neighbouring Aalsmeer, greenhouse-based agriculture is very important to the local economy.

== Architecture ==
Perhaps the most remarkable edifice in Kudelstaart is the fort belonging to the Stelling van Amsterdam. Construction started in 1890. In 1906, a large bombproof main building was constructed. Since 1959, it is in use as a marina.

== Public transport ==
- 357 - Kudelstaart - Aalsmeer - Amstelveen - Amsterdam City Centre - Amsterdam Centraal

This service is very frequent, quarter-hourly during the day and half-hourly in the evenings.

== Gallery ==
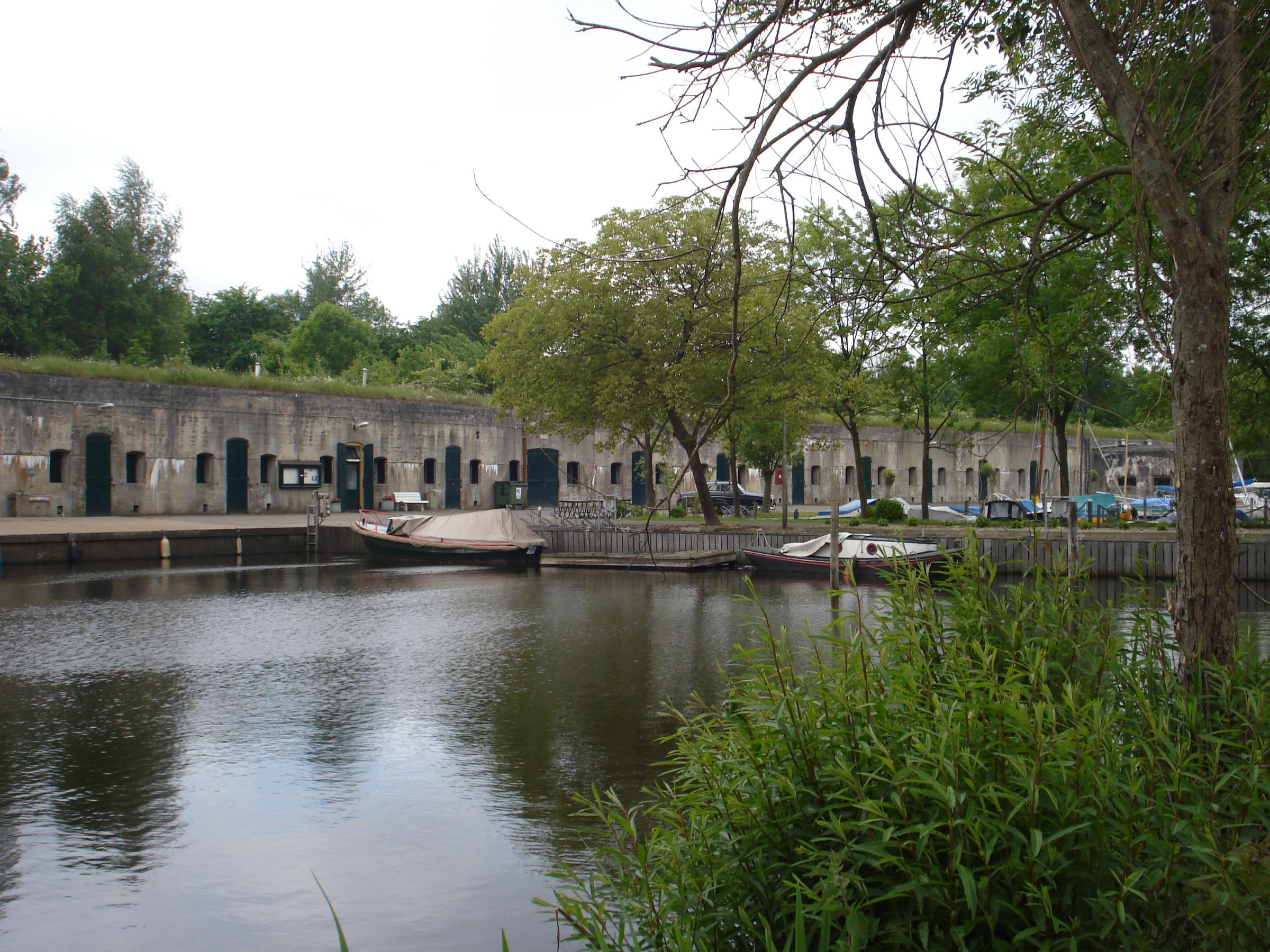
Fort Kudelstraat

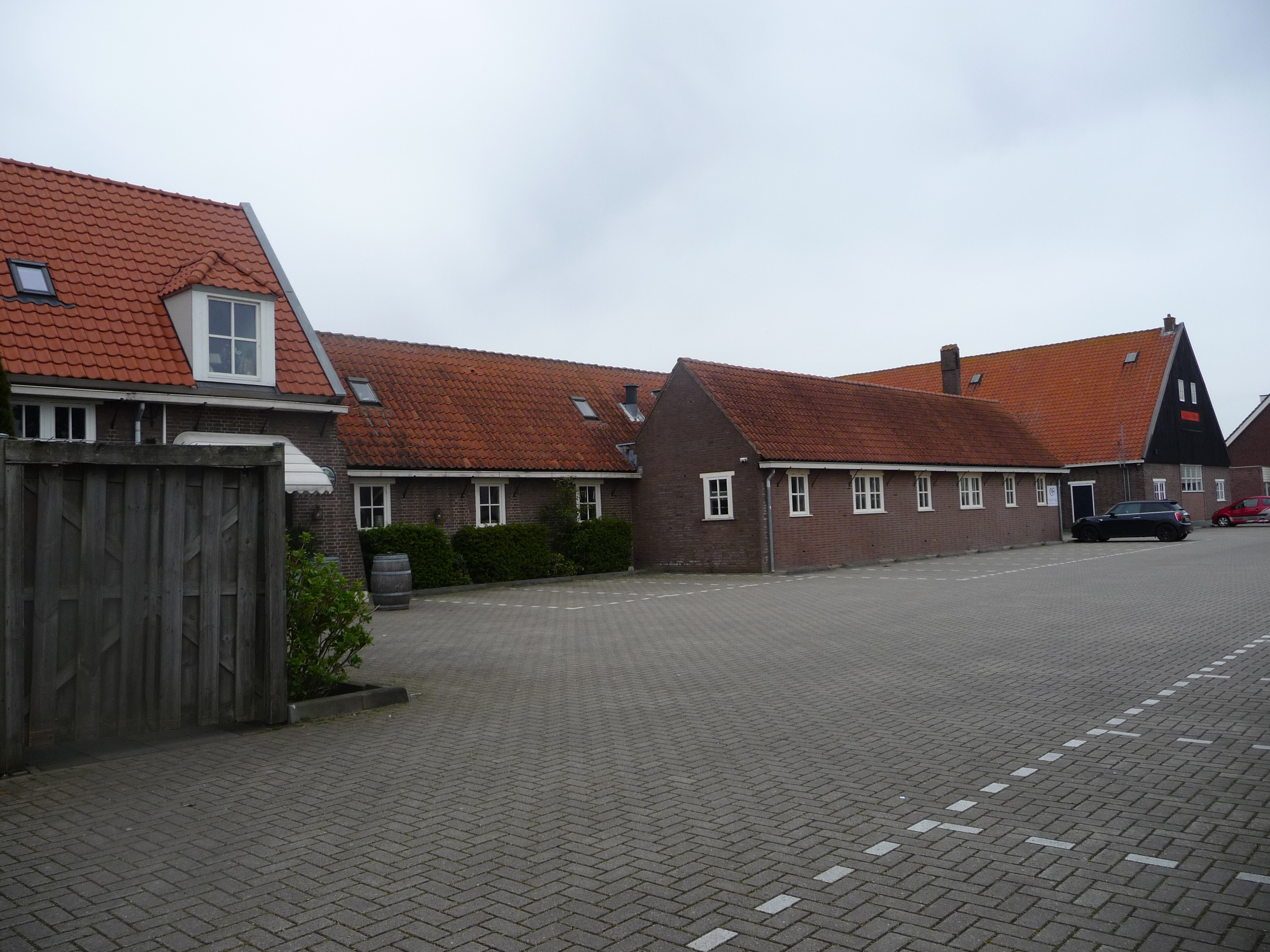
Restaurant
