= Van Driel =

Van Driel is a Dutch toponymic surname meaning "from Driel" or "from Maasdriel", which municipality was until recently called "Driel" as well. People with the surname include:

- Berry van Driel (born 1984), Dutch baseball player
- Darius van Driel (born 1989), Dutch golfer
- Guido van Driel (born 1962), Dutch comics artist and movie director
- Mels van Driel (born 1983), Dutch footballer
- Raymond van Driel (born 1983), Dutch footballer
- Rita van Driel (born 1961), Secretary General of the National Paralympic Committee of the Netherlands
- Sonja van Driel (born 1959), Dutch photographer
- Toon van Driel (born 1945), Dutch cartoonist
- Jan van Driel (fl. 1990–present), Dutch science education researcher

Repelaer van Driel:

- Ocker Repelaer van Driel (1759–1832), Dutch government minister
- Roline Repelaer van Driel (born 1984), Dutch rower
