= Nieuwebrug =

Nieuwebrug ("New Bridge") is the name of several towns in the Netherlands:

- Nieuwebrug, North Holland in the Haarlemmermeer
- Nieuwebrug, Friesland
- Nieuwebrug, Overijssel
