= Haarlemmermeer =

- Municipality
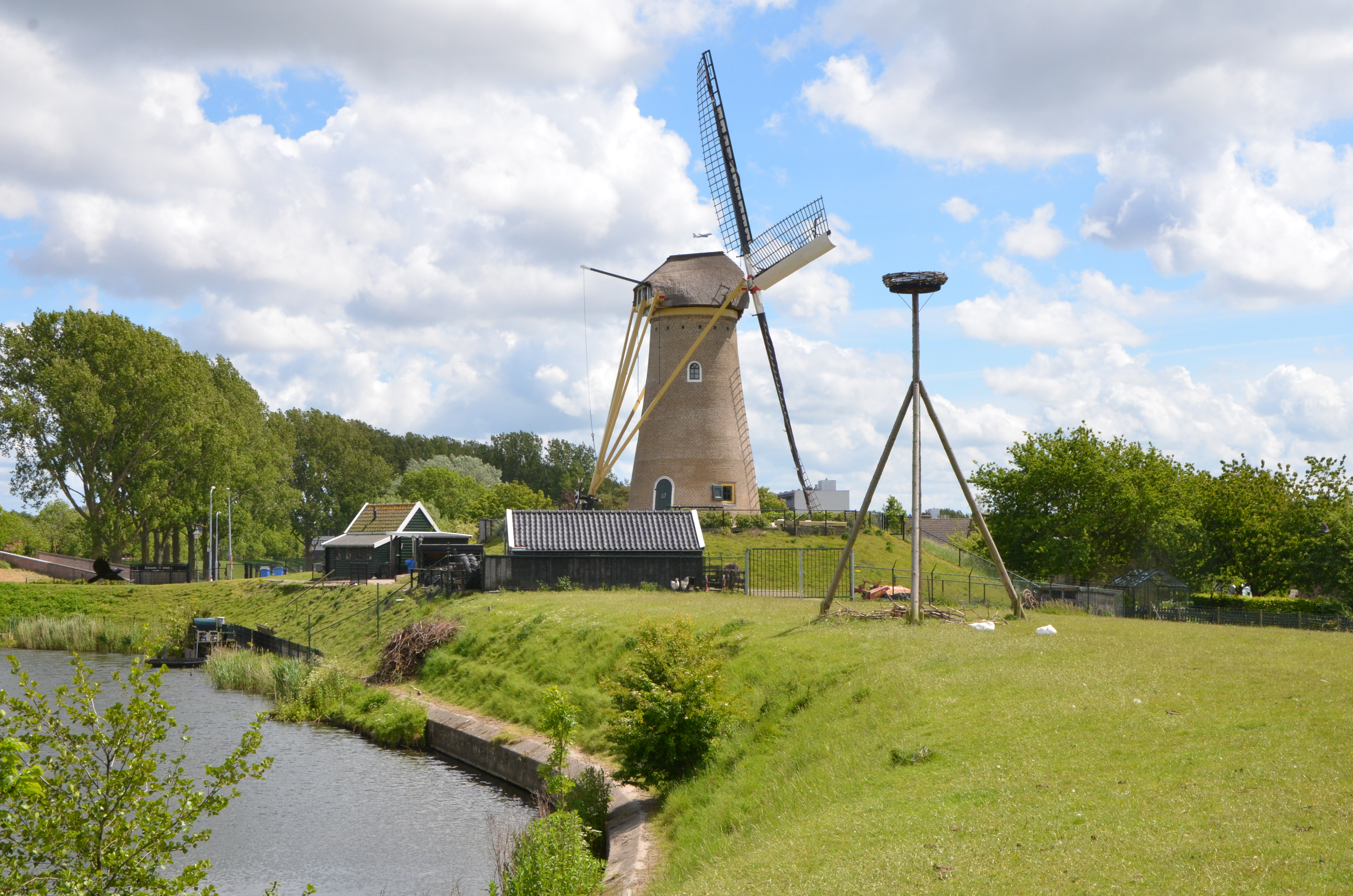
- Windmill in Hoofddorp

- Flag Coat of arms

- Location in North Holland
- Coordinates: 52°18′N 4°42′E
- Country: Netherlands
- Province: North Holland
- Region: Amsterdam metropolitan area

Government
  - Body: Municipal council
  - Mayor: Marianne Schuurmans-Wijdeven (VVD)

Area
  - Total: 206.31 km^{2} (79.66 sq mi)
  - Land: 197.48 km^{2} (76.25 sq mi)
  - Water: 8.83 km^{2} (3.41 sq mi)
- Elevation: −4 m (−13 ft)

Population (January 2026)
  - Total: 166,978
  - Density: 846/km^{2} (2,190/sq mi)
- Demonym: Haarlemmermeerder
- Time zone: UTC+1 (CET)
  - Summer (DST): UTC+2 (CEST)
- Postcode: Parts of 1100, 1400, 2000 and 2100 ranges
- Area code: 020, 023, 0252, 0297
- Website: haarlemmermeergemeente.nl/en

Haarlemmermeer (Dutch pronunciation: [ˌɦaːrlɛmərˈmeːr]) is a municipality in the west of the Netherlands, in the province of North Holland. Haarlemmermeer is a polder, consisting of land reclaimed from water. The name Haarlemmermeer means 'Haarlem's lake', referring to the body of water from which the region was reclaimed in the 19th century.

Haarlemmermeer's main town is Hoofddorp, which has a population of 76,660. Hoofddorp, along with the rapidly growing towns of Nieuw-Vennep and Badhoevedorp, are part of the Randstad agglomeration. The main international airport of the Netherlands, Schiphol, is located in Haarlemmermeer.

== History ==
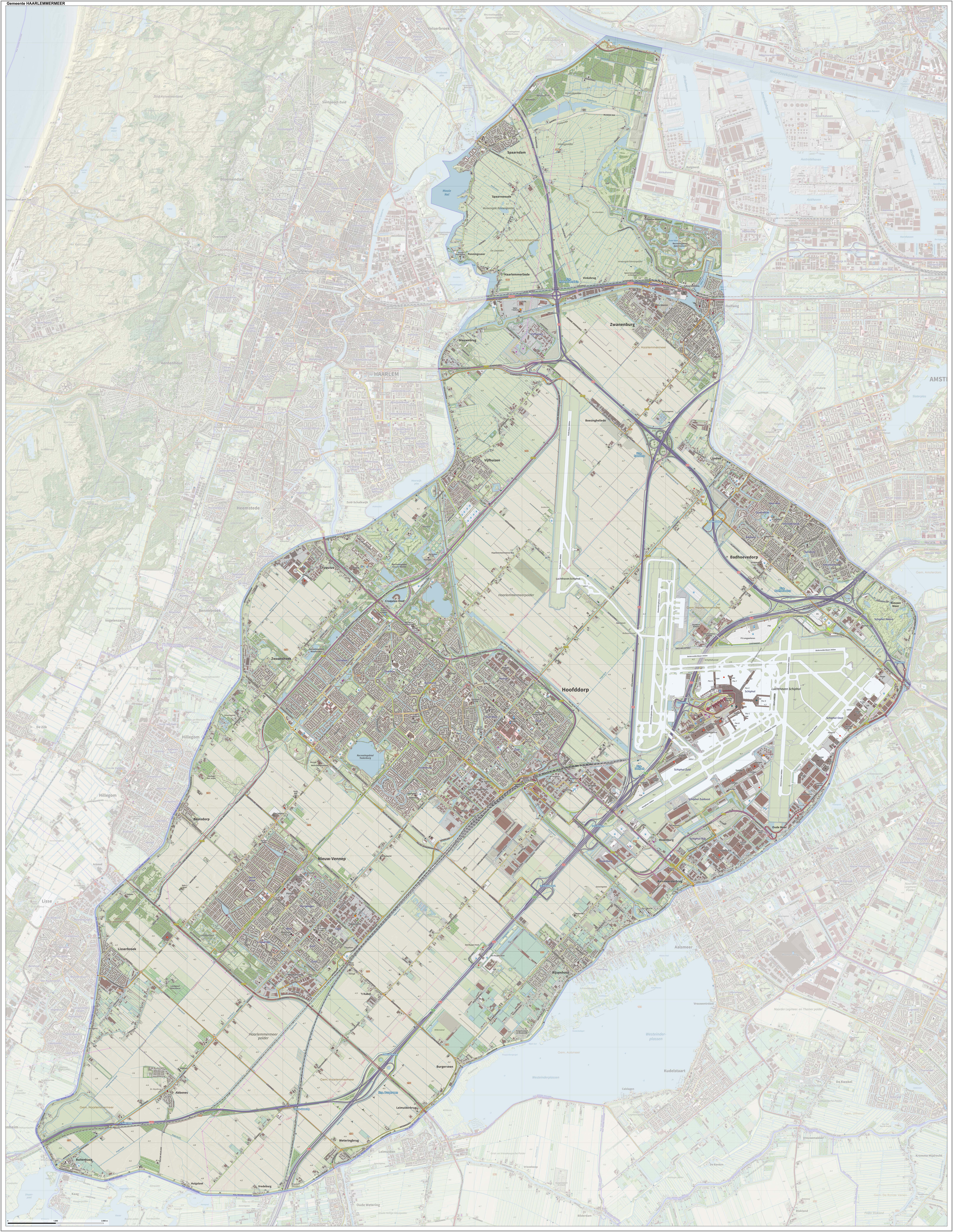
Map of Haarlemmermeer, June 2015

The original Haarlemmermeer lake is said to have been mostly a peat bog, a relic of a northern arm of the Rhine which passed through the district in Roman times. In 1531, the original Haarlemmermeer had an area of 26.0 square kilometres (10.0 mi^{2}), and near it were three smaller lakes: the Leidsche Meer (Leiden Lake), the Spiering Meer, and the Oude Meer (Old Lake), with a combined area of about 31 square kilometres (12 mi^{2}).

The four lakes were formed into one by successive floods with the Haarlemmermeer name being applied to the combined lake. Villages disappeared in the process. One of those villages was Vennep, after which the modern Nieuw-Vennep was named. In Dutch, the tendency for lakes to grow over time is called the waterwolf. During the Dutch War of Independence, the waters of the Haarlemmermeer were the scene of the Battle of Haarlemmermeer, a naval engagement between a Spanish fleet and the ships of the Dutch rebels known as "Sea Beggars", who were trying to break the Siege of Haarlem.

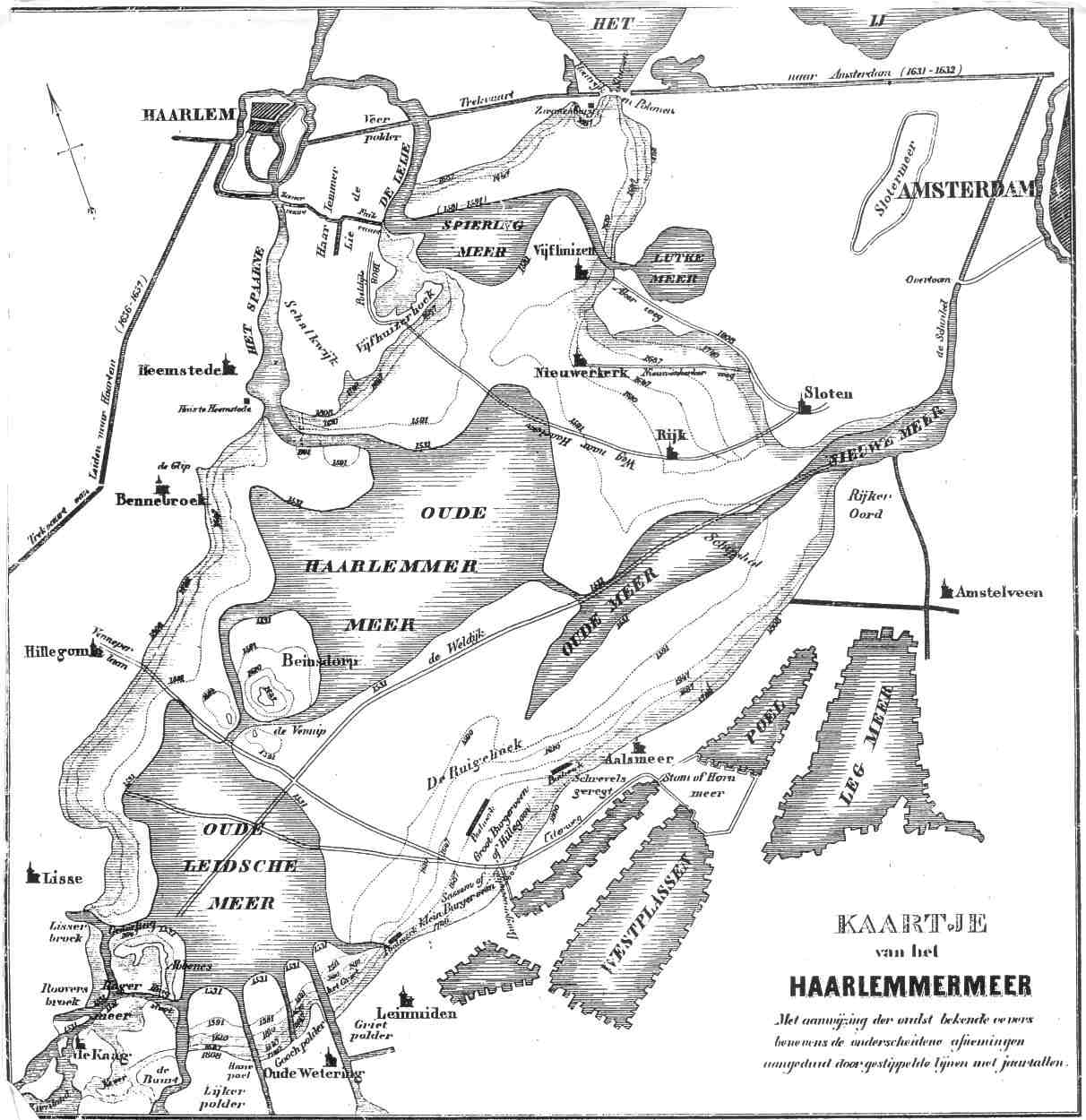
Historic map of the Haarlemmermeer before reclamation.

The Haarlemmermeer could be a dangerous place during storms. On 7 January 1629, Frederick Henry of the Palatinate, son and heir of Frederick V, the "Winter King" drowned trying to cross it. By 1647, the new Haarlemmermeer had an area of about 150 square kilometres (58 mi^{2}), which a century later had increased to over 170 square kilometres (66 mi^{2}).

In 1643, Jan Adriaanszoon Leeghwater proposed to dike and drain the lake. Similar schemes, among which those of Nicolaus Samuel Cruquius in 1742 and of Baron van Lijnden van Hemmen in 1820, were proposed from time to time. But it was not until a furious hurricane in November 1836 drove the waters as far as the gates of Amsterdam, and another on Christmas Day sent them in the opposite direction to submerge the streets of Leiden, that the matter was seriously considered.

On 1 August 1837, King William I appointed a royal commission of inquiry. Their proposal receiving the sanction of the Dutch Parliament's Second Chamber in March 1839, and in the following May the work was begun.

First, a canal was dug around the lake, called Ringvaart (Ring Canal), to carry the water drainage and boat and ship traffic which had previously gone across the lake. This canal was 61 kilometres (38 mi) long, and 2.40 metres (7.9 ft) deep, and the excavated earth was used to build a dike from 30 to 50 metres (98 to 164 ft) wide around the lake. The area enclosed by the canal was more than 180 square kilometres (69 mi^{2}), and the average depth of the lake 4 metres (13 ft). As the water had no natural drainage, it was calculated that probably 1000 million tons of water would have to be raised by mechanical means.

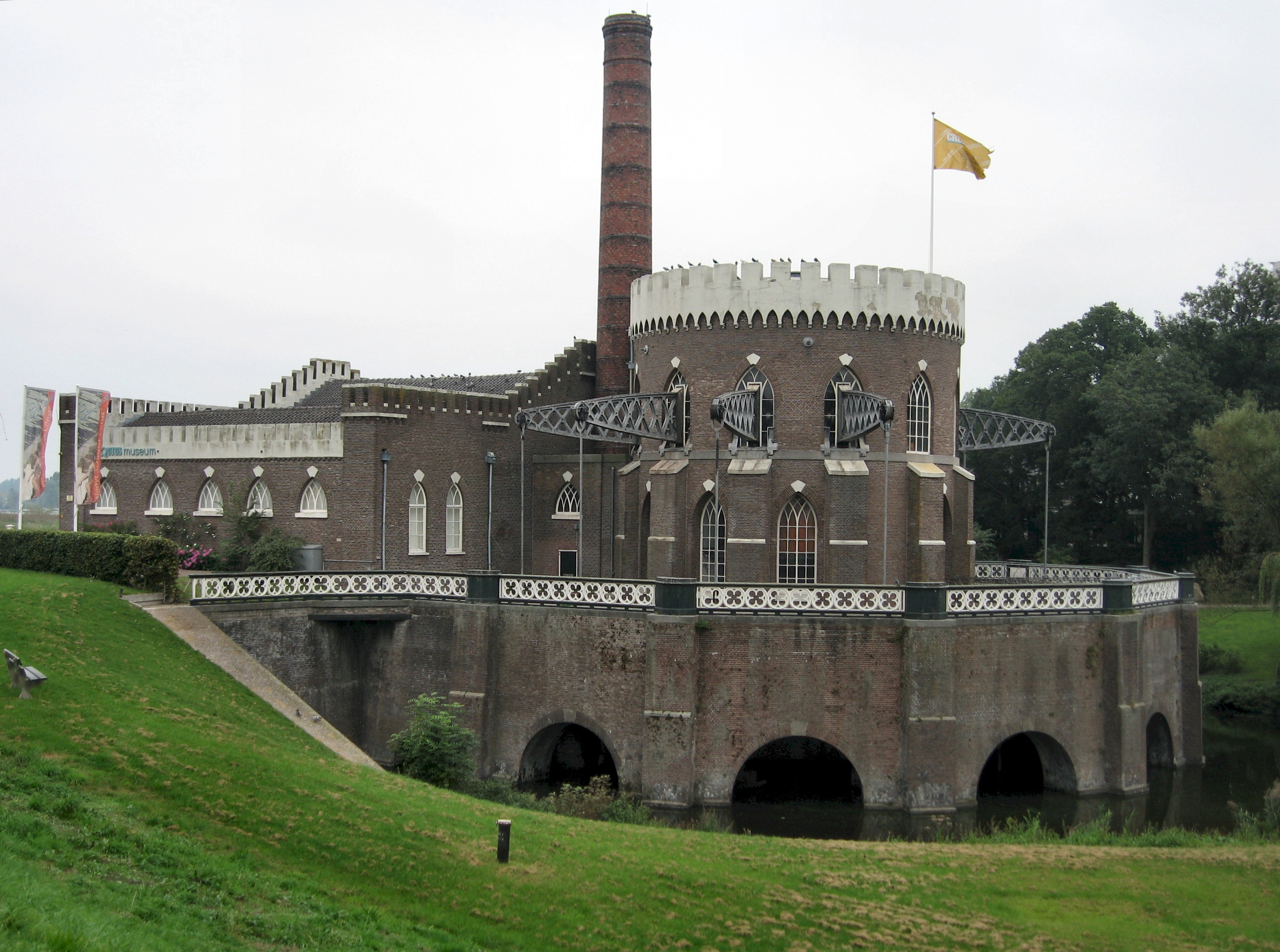
Pumping Station Cruquius

All of the pumping was done by steam mills, an innovation contrasting with the historic practice of draining polders using windmills. Three Cornish beam engines were imported from Hayle: the Leeghwater, the Cruquius (the largest Watt-design reciprocal stroke steam engine ever built and now a museum), and the Lijnden. Pumping began in 1848, and the lake was dry by July 1, 1852; 800 million tons of water were actually discharged. At the first sale of the highest lands along the banks on 16 August 1853, about £28 per acre was paid; but the average price afterwards was less. The whole area of 170.36 square kilometres (65.78 mi^{2}) recovered from the waters brought in 9,400,000 guilders, or about £780,000, exactly covering the cost of the enterprise; so that the actual cost to the nation was only the amount of the interest on the capital, or about £368,000.

The soil is of various kinds, loam, clay, sand, and peat. Most of it is fertile enough, though in the lower portions there are barren patches where the scanty vegetation is covered with an ochreous deposit. Mineral springs occur containing a very high percentage (3.245 grams per litre) of common salt; and in 1893 a company was formed to work them.

In 1854, the city of Leiden laid claim to the possession of the new territory, but the courts decided in favor of the nation. Haarlemmermeer became incorporated as a municipality in the province of North Holland by law on 16 July 1855. Its first mayor was Matthijs Samuel Petrus Pabst. The first church was built in the same year and by 1877 there were seven. By 1860 its population was 7237, and 40 years later in 1900, it was 16,621.

Initially agriculture dominated in Haarlemmermeer. But with 99% of the land owned by a few wealthy land owners, poor harvests and low commodity prices, life was very difficult for the tenant farmers. After 1900, the situation improved when commodity prices rose and most farmers owned their own land. Then greenhouse farming developed. Seasonal labourers, attracted by good pay, boosted the population by settling in the villages along the Ringvaart. Maize, seeds, cattle, butter, and cheese were the principal produce. Today, large industrial and office developments have become prominent, especially at Hoofddorp and Schiphol.

The roads which traverse the commune are bordered by pleasant-looking farmhouses built after the various styles of Holland, Friesland and Brabant, reflecting the various origins of the farmers. Hoofddorp, Venneperdorp or Nieuw-Vennep, Abbenes, and the vicinities of the pumping stations are the spots where the population has clustered most densely.

In 1917 a military airport was built near the old fort of Schiphol. Nowadays, Schiphol Airport is the major civilian aviation hub in the Netherlands, using 15% of Haarlemmermeer's land area. In 1926, Amsterdam's municipal council took over the management of Schiphol. After Stockholm's airport, Schiphol was the second airport in Europe to have hardened runways, in 1937–1938.{{Citation needed}}

In the first half of the 20th century, a number of steam railway lines were built in Haarlemmermeer; most were abandoned only a couple of decades later. On 1 January 2019, the municipality of Haarlemmerliede en Spaarnwoude merged with Haarlemmermeer.

== Population centres ==
The municipality of Haarlemmermeer contains the following cities, towns and villages: Aalsmeerderbrug, Abbenes, Badhoevedorp, Beinsdorp, Boesingheliede, Buitenkaag, Burgerveen, Cruquius, De Hoek, Haarlemmerliede, Halfweg, Hoofddorp, 't Kabel, Leimuiderbrug, Lijnden, Lisserbroek, Nieuwe Meer, Nieuwebrug, Nieuw-Vennep, Oude Meer, Penningsveer, Rijsenhout, Rozenburg, North Holland, Schiphol, Schiphol-Rijk, Spaarndam (partly), Spaarnwoude, Vijfhuizen, Vinkebrug, Weteringbrug, Zwaanshoek, Zwanenburg.

== Monuments and parks ==
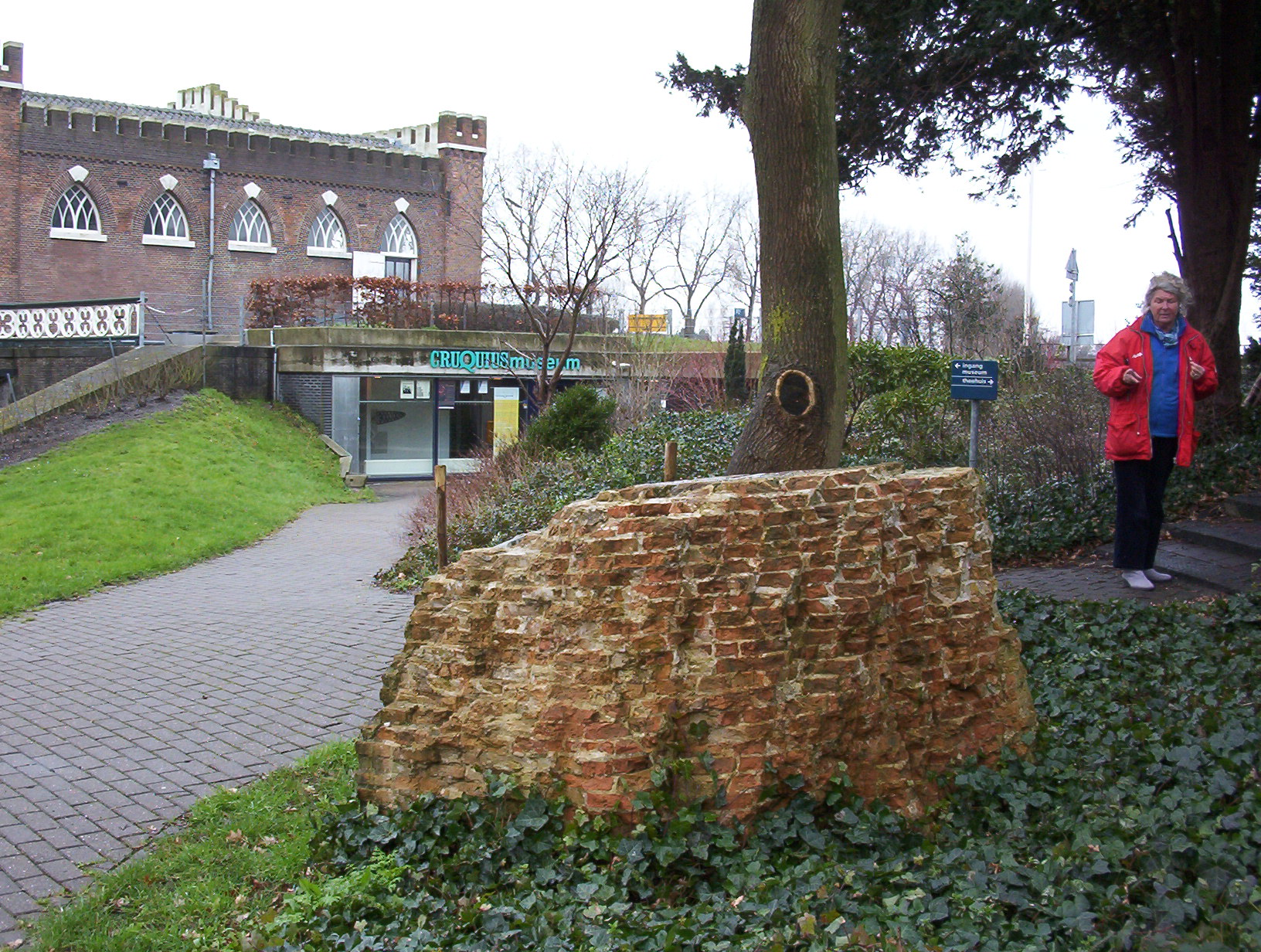
Cruquiusmuseum entrance, taken from Cruquiusmuseum park

- Stelling van Amsterdam – the old defense line of Amsterdam crosses the Haarlemmermeer. Plans are being made to make this entire defense line walkable, but currently it is not possible to cross the major highway A4 that goes through it. This park is accessible at various points for recreation, including the Haarlemmermeer Woods.
- Haarlemmermeer Woods (Dutch: 'Haarlemmermeerse Bos') – the largest public park in Haarlemmermeer and site of the International garden show Floriade 2002, the park includes a large lake for swimming in the summer and a 40-meter manmade hill called Spotter's Hill. The Haarlemmermeer Woods is home to events such as horse shows and the Mysteryland music festival.
- Museum De Cruquius – the Cruquius museum is in one of the steam mills used to pump the Haarlemmermeer dry and is open to the public for a demonstration of the steam engine and a model of the Netherlands waterways and polders. Because the Cruquius steam engine is the largest ever built, the museum is an Anchor Point of ERIH, The European Route of Industrial Heritage. Behind the museum is a park.

== Economy ==
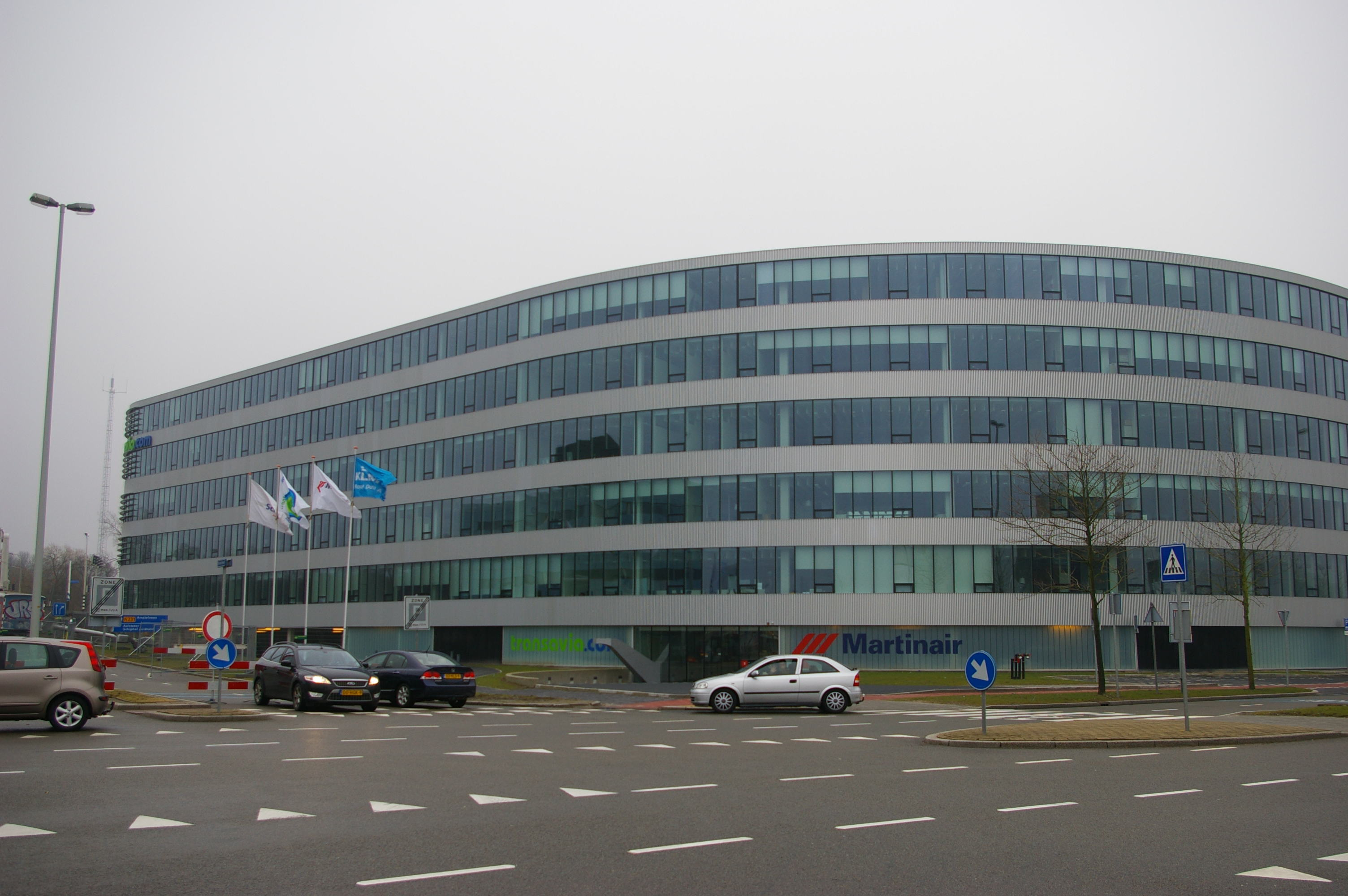
TransPort Building – Houses head offices of Martinair and Transavia

Four airlines, TUI fly Netherlands, KLM Cityhopper, Martinair, and Transavia have their headquarters on the grounds of Schiphol Airport in Haarlemmermeer. The airline alliance SkyTeam has its offices in the World Trade Center Schiphol building on the grounds of Schiphol Airport. Schiphol Group, which operates the airport, has its head office on the airport property. Iran Air has its Netherlands sales office in the World Trade Center building. Nippon Cargo Airlines has its Europe regional offices there as well. Corendon Dutch Airlines has its head office in Lijnden, Haarlemmermeer. Lijnden also has the Amsterdam branch office of Corendon Airlines.

Also, the international organization representing air navigation service providers (air traffic controllers), Civil Air Navigation Services Organisation (CANSO) has its headquarters in Schiphol Airport.

At one time KLM had its head office on the grounds of Schiphol Airport. Its current head office in Amstelveen had a scheduled completion at the end of 1970. When Air Holland existed, its head office was in Oude Meer, Haarlemmermeer. At one time NLM CityHopper had its head office at the airport.

== Transportation ==
=== Roadways ===
One of the busiest freeways in the Netherlands, the A4 from Amsterdam to Den Haag, crosses right through Haarlemmermeer. Other freeways are the A5, from Hoofddorp to Amsterdam Sloterdijk, A9 from Alkmaar to Diemen and the A44, from Nieuw-Vennep to Wassenaar.

==== Calatrava bridges ====
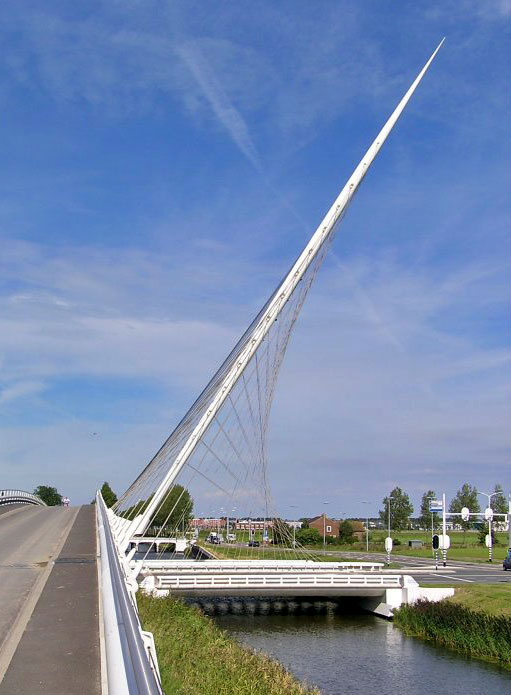
Calatrava bridge – Cittern

In the presence of HM Queen Beatrix, in 2004 three bridges designed by the Spanish architect Santiago Calatrava were opened. The bridges span the main canal of the Haarlemmermeer and are named after three string instruments; Harp, Cittern, and Lute. In 2006 two of those bridges' structures already displayed clear signs of corrosion, and had to be repaired.

=== Aviation ===
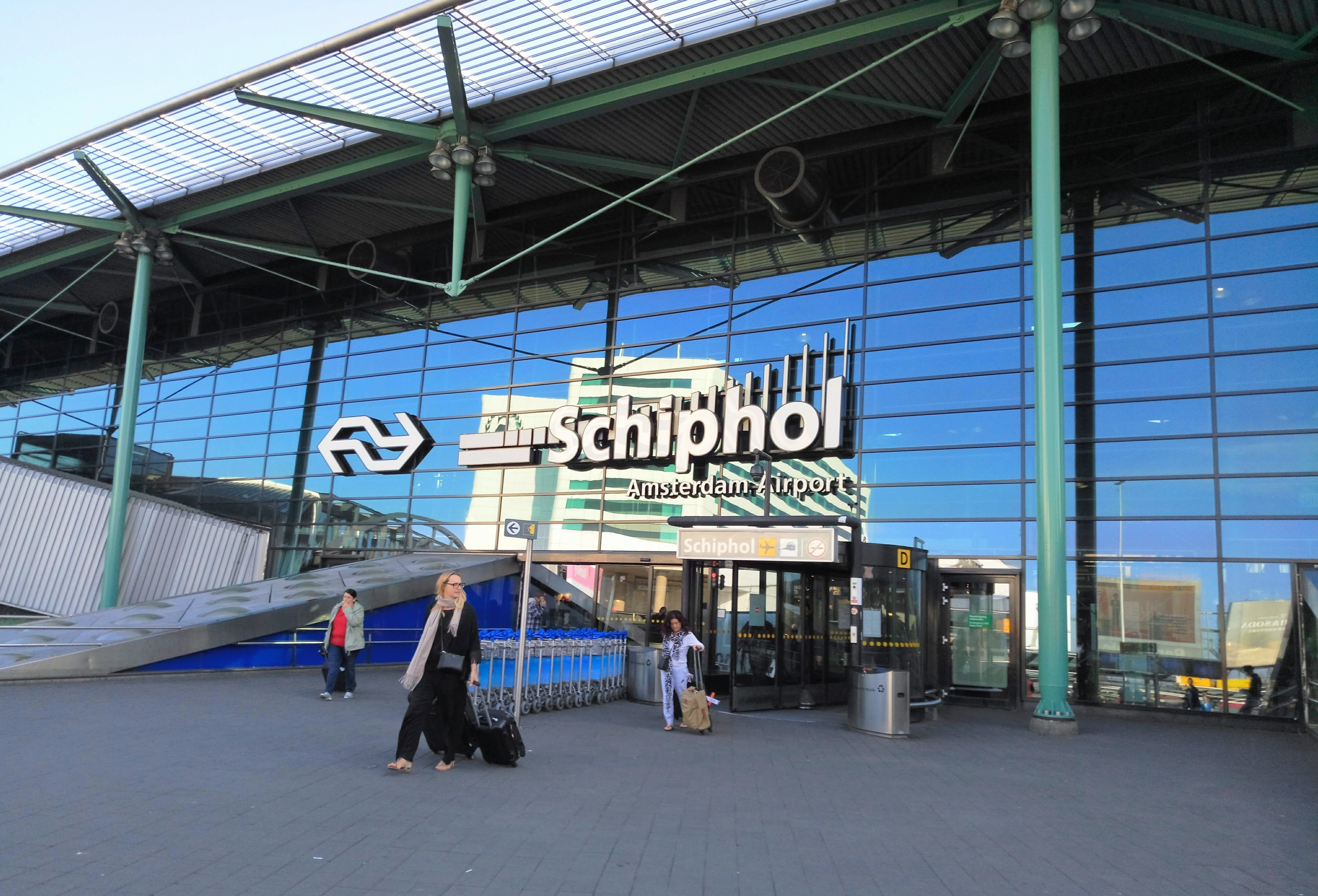
Schiphol Airport

Amsterdam Airport Schiphol, the principal international airport of the Netherlands, is also situated in Haarlemmermeer.

=== Railway ===
Nederlandse Spoorwegen, the Dutch National Railways, serves the municipality with three stations: Hoofddorp, Nieuw-Vennep, and Schiphol Airport (which serves high speed rail as well).

There was a network of local steam railways across Harlemmermeer in the early 20th century, the Haarlemmermeer railway lines.

Railway **Leiden Centraal to Schiphol** (part of line 10), with stations (municipalities in bold) and official station abbreviations:
- **Leiden** Centraal (ledn)
- Nieuw Vennep (nvp) (mun. **Haarlemmermeer**)
- Hoofddorp (hfd) (dito)
- Schiphol (shl) (dito)

=== Water transport ===
The Ringvaart is an important waterway for commercial and recreational boats alike. A portion of it forms part of the sailroute from Hollands Diep to the IJsselmeer, passable for ships with masts over 6 meters tall. There is also a connection to the Kaag Lake system (Kagerplassen), which extends to Leiden and beyond.

There are several canals within Haarlemmermeer itself, the main ones are Hoofdvaart (Main Canal) and Kruisvaart (Cross Canal). But these had initially no connection to the outside waterways, meaning that goods had to be reloaded at the ring dike. In 1895 a double canal lock was built at Aalsmeer, boosting the economy. In the 1950s this lock was closed and the canals are once again no longer used for shipping.

== Government ==
=== City council ===
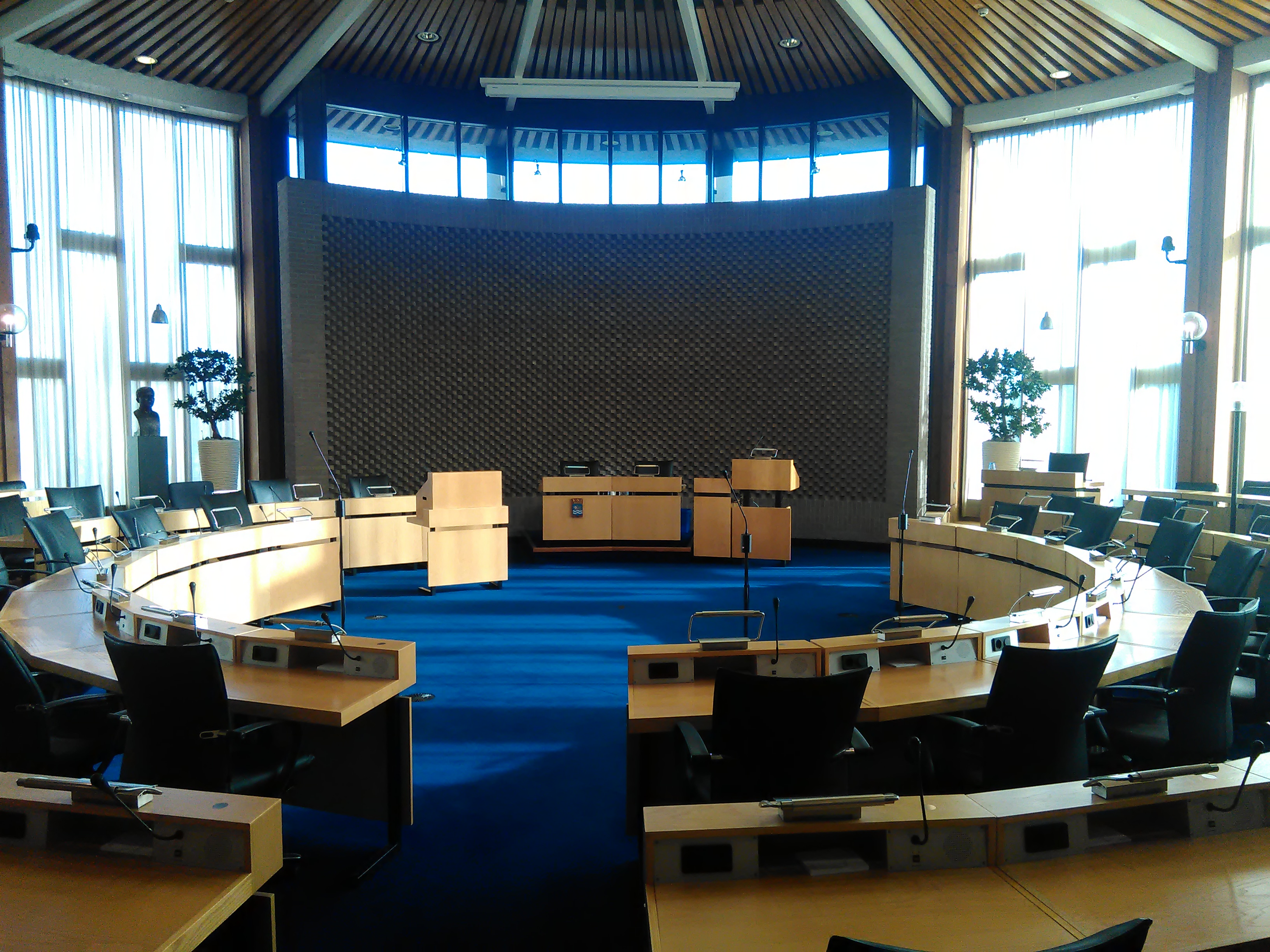
Boardroom of the City Council in Hoofddorp

The municipal council of Haarlemmermeer consists of 39 seats, which at the 2026 municipal elections divided as follows:

- VVD – 8 seats
- Groenlinks / PvdA – 5 seats
- D66 – 5 seats
- Forum for Democracy – 4 seat
- CDA – 4 seats
- Forza! Haarlemmermeer – 3 seats
- Haarlemmermeerse Actieve Politiek – 2 seats
- 50PLUS – 2 seats
- PVV – 1 seat
- Een Haarlemmermeer – 1 seat
- Sociaal Rechts Haarlemmermeer – 1 seat
- Hart van Haarlemmermeer – 1 seat
- ChristenUnie/SGP – 1 seat
- DENK – 1 seat

=== National government ===
The Netherlands Aviation Safety Board, during its existence, had its head office in Hoofddorp in Haarlemmermeer. The Dutch Transport Safety Board, the successor agency, was established on 1 July 1999 and the Netherlands Aviation Safety Board was merged into the agency at that time.

== International relations ==
=== Twin towns – sister cities ===
The following cities have a sister city relationship with the Haarlemmermeer municipality:

- Cebu City, Philippines
- Hódmezővásárhely, Hungary

To honour the relationship, three structures in Hoofddorp are named after the sister cities: The Cebu City bridge and the Hódmezővásárhely fountain.

== Notable people ==
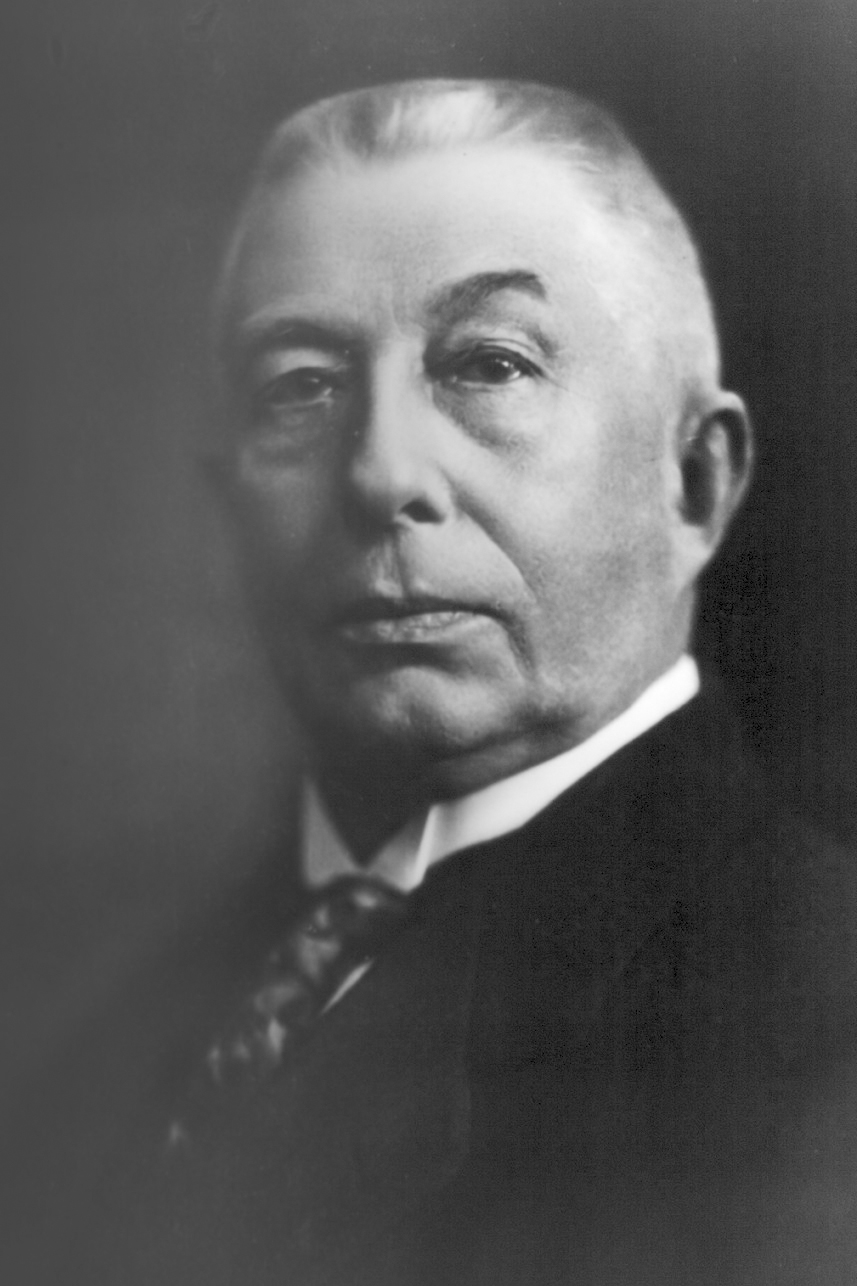
Hendrik Colijn, 1925

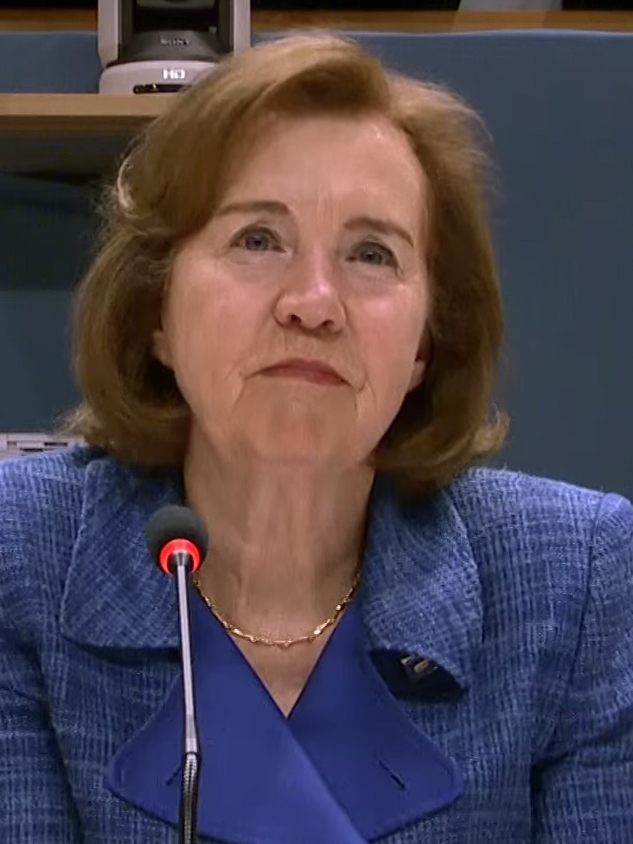
Tineke Netelenbos, 2015

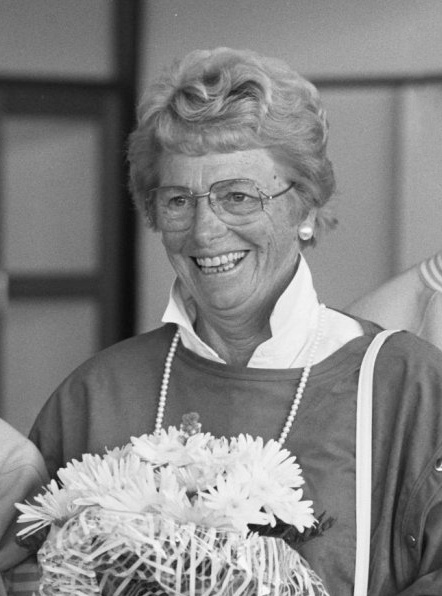
Fanny Blankers-Koen, 1988

- Hendrikus Colijn (1869 in Burgerveen – 1944) a politician, Prime Minister of the Netherlands 1925/1926 & 1933/1939
- Gerrit Verkuyl (1872 in Haarlemmermeer – 1967) a New Testament Greek scholar and Bible Translator in the US
- Machiel van den Heuvel (1900 in Haarlemmermeer – 1946) a Dutch army officer and Escape Officer for the Dutch POWs in Oflag IV-C at Colditz Castle
- Arnold Meijer (1905 in Haarlemmermeer – 1965) a Dutch fascist politician
- Tom Gehrels (1925 in Haarlemmermeer – 2011) a Dutch–American astronomer and academic
- Jan van Houwelingen (1939 in Leerdam – 2013) a politician, Mayor of Haarlemmermeer 1994/2003
- Tineke Netelenbos (born 1944 in Wormerveer) a retired politician, Mayor of Haarlemmermeer 2006/7
- Rick van der Linden (1946 in Badhoevedorp – 2006) a composer and keyboardist
- Jacob Wit (1952 in Haarlemmermeer – 2024) a justice of the Caribbean Court of Justice located in Trinidad and Tobago
- Sonja van Driel (born 1959 in Haarlemmermeer) a photographer
- Cas Jansen (born 1977 in Badhoevedorp) an actor

=== Sport ===
- Dirk van Foreest (1862 in Haarlemmermeer – 1956) a chess master
- Arnold van Foreest (1863 in Haarlemmermeer – 1954) a chess master
- Fanny Blankers-Koen (1918 in Lage Vuursche – 2004) a Dutch track and field athlete, won four gold medals at the 1948 Summer Olympics
- Daphne Jongejans (born 1965 in Badhoevedorp) a retired female diver, participated in three consecutive Summer Olympics: 1984, 1988 and 1992
- Hennie Dompeling (born 1966 in Haarlemmermeer) a Dutch sport shooter, competed in skeet shooting at five Olympics (1988 to 2004)
- Edwin Jongejans (born 1966 in Amstelveen) a retired diver, competed at the 1988 and 1992 Olympics
- Joop Stokkel (born 1967 in Aalsmeerderbrug) a Dutch Paralympian and leading equestrian
- Michiel Bartman (born 1967 in Badhoevedorp) a former rower, gold medallist at the 1996 Summer Olympics and silver medallist in the 2000 and 2004 Summer Olympics
- Marcel Keizer (born 1969 in Badhoevedorp) a football coach who formerly coached at clubs such as AFC Ajax and Sporting CP
- Robert van Boxel (born 1983 in Zwanenburg) a professional footballer, over 250 club caps
- Mitchell Donald (born in 1988 in Nieuw-Vennep) a Surinamese professional footballer who previously played for AFC Ajax
- Renate Jansen (born 1990 in Abbenes) a Dutch female international footballer
- Calvin Stengs (born in 1998 in Nieuw-Vennep) a Dutch professional footballer currently playing for Feyenoord
- Sven Botman (born 2000 in Badhoevedorp) a Dutch professional footballer currently playing for Newcastle United F.C.
- Rinus VeeKay (born 2000 in Hoofddorp) a Dutch racing driver currently driving in IndyCar for Ed Carpenter Racing
- Déron Payne (born 2002 in Hoofddorp) a Trinidadian professional footballer currently playing for FC Volendam
