= Burgerveen =

- Village
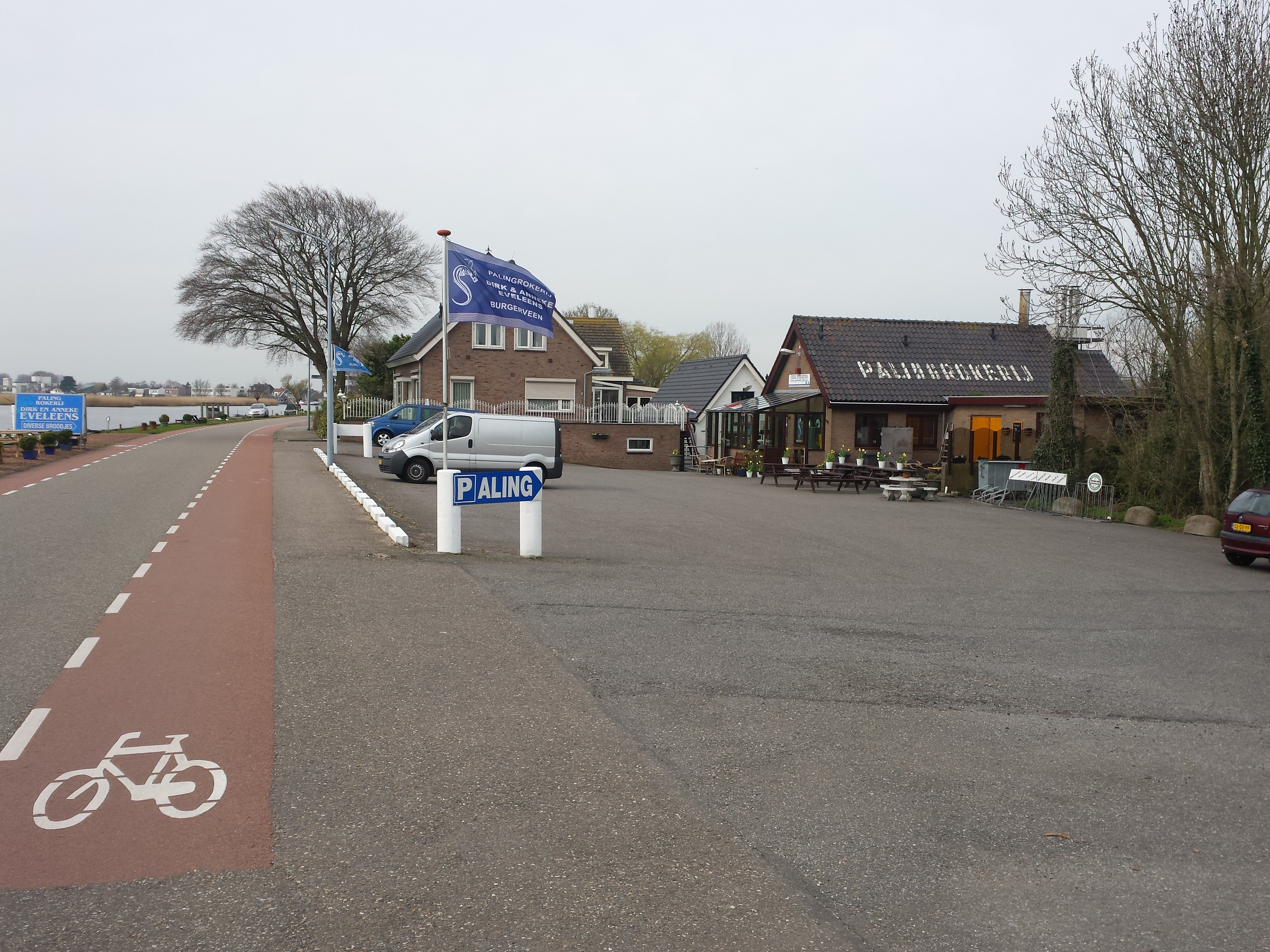
- Restaurant in Burgerveen

- Location in the Netherlands Location in the province of North Holland in the Netherlands
- Country: Netherlands
- Province: North Holland
- Municipality: Haarlemmermeer

Area
  - Total: 1.24 km^{2} (0.48 sq mi)
- Elevation: −4.0 m (−13.1 ft)

Population (2021)
  - Total: 340
  - Density: 270/km^{2} (710/sq mi)
- Time zone: UTC+1 (CET)
  - Summer (DST): UTC+2 (CEST)
- Postal code: 2154
- Dialing code: 0172

Burgerveen is a village in the western Netherlands. It is located in the municipality of Haarlemmermeer, North Holland, about halfway between Amsterdam and The Hague.

The current village was first mentioned in 1867 as Burgerveen. It is named after the village which was lost in the Haarlemmermeer which was named after the burgrave of Leiden. The old village was abandoned by 1417, and lost in the lake shortly after 1613.

== Born in Burgerveen ==
- Hendrikus Colijn (1869–1944), twice prime minister of the Netherlands.

== Gallery ==
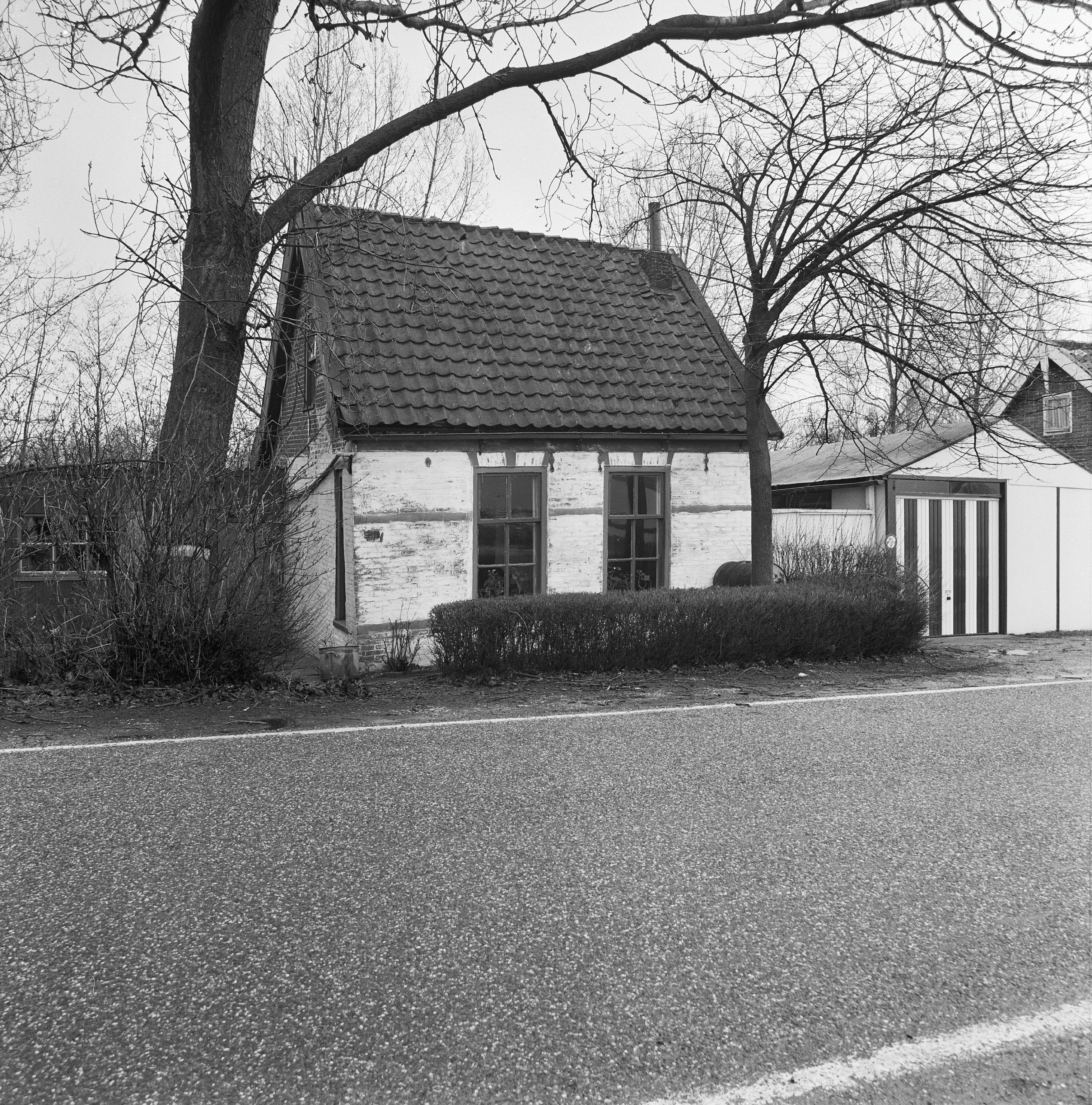
House in Burgerveen

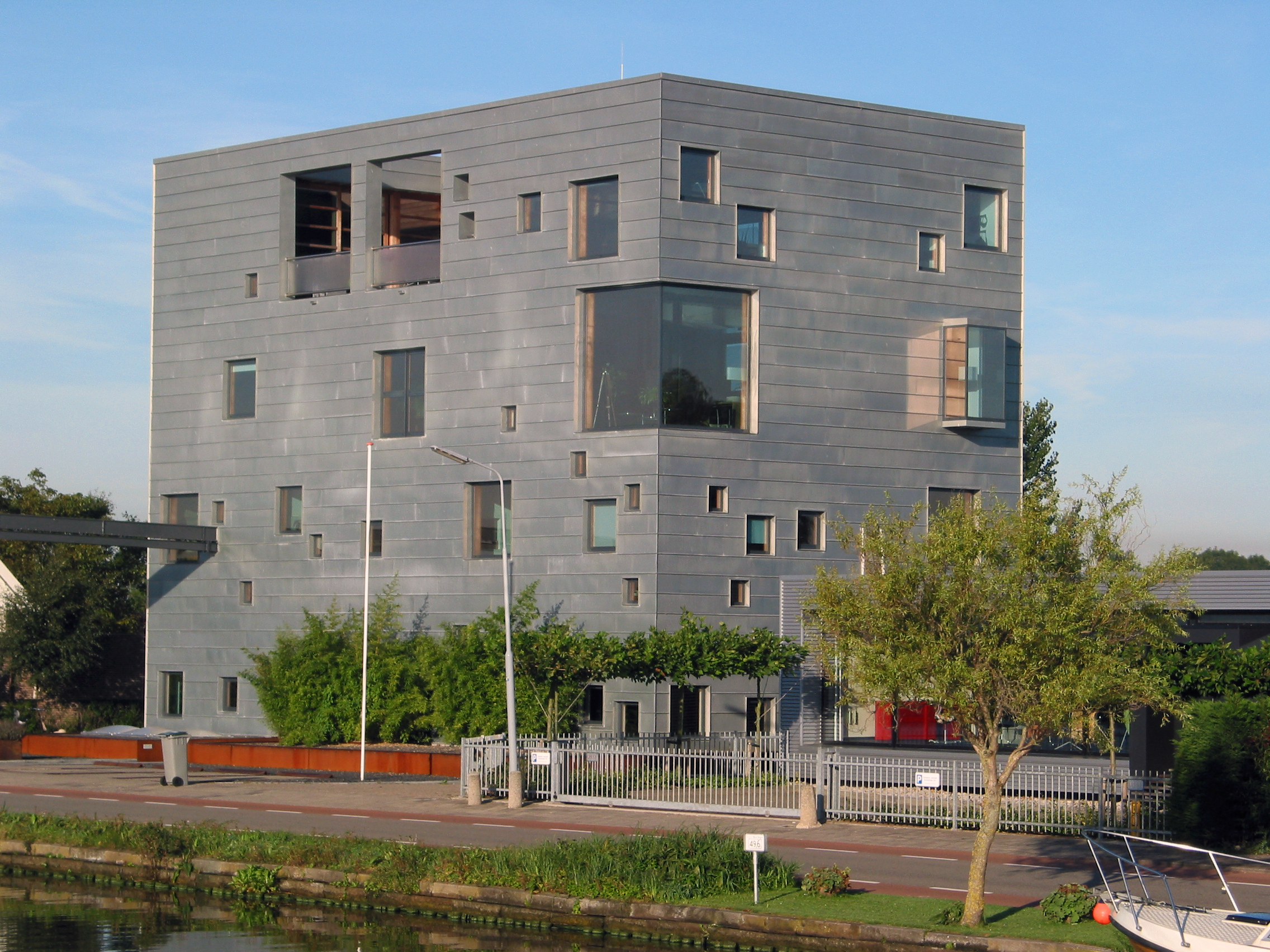
Cube house
