= Vinkebrug =

Coordinates: 52°23′N 4°43′E

- hamlet
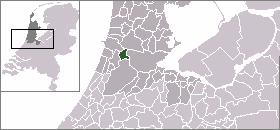

- Country: Netherlands
- Province: North Holland
- Municipality: Haarlemmermeer

Vinkebrug is a hamlet in the Dutch province of North Holland. It is a part of the municipality of Haarlemmermeer and lies about 6 km (3.7 mi) east of Haarlem.
