= 't Kabel =

- Hamlet
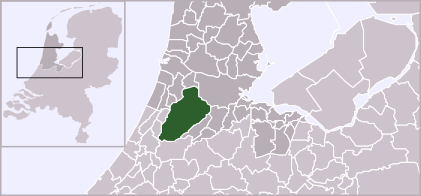

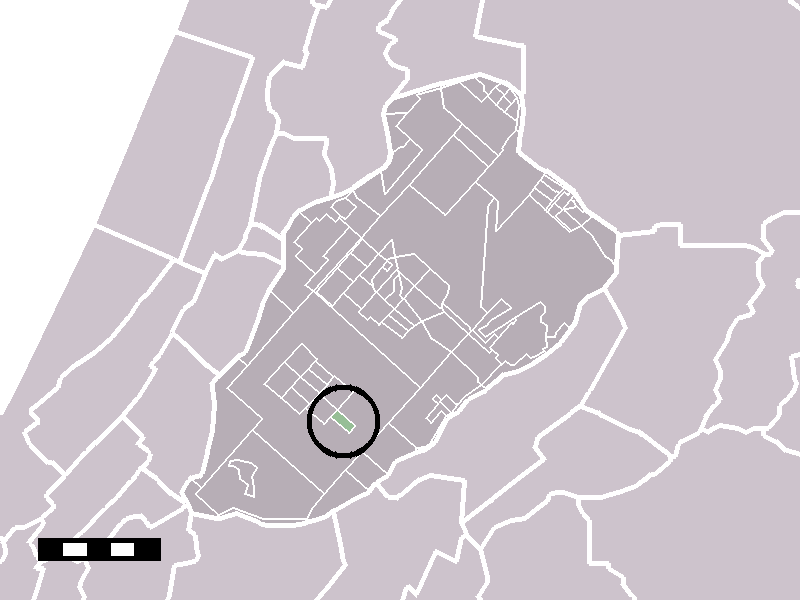
- Kabel in the municipality of Haarlemmermeer.
- Coordinates: 52°15′N 4°39′E
- Country: Netherlands
- Province: North Holland
- Municipality: Haarlemmermeer

Population (2004)
  - Total: 100
- Time zone: UTC+1 (CET)
  - Summer (DST): UTC+2 (CEST)
- Postal code: 2153
- Dialing code: 0252

't Kabel is a hamlet in the Dutch province of North Holland. It is a part of the municipality of Haarlemmermeer, and lies just southeast of Nieuw-Vennep and about 6 km southwest of Hoofddorp.

Kabel has a population of around 100.
