= Zwaanshoek =

Village in North Holland, Netherlands

- Village
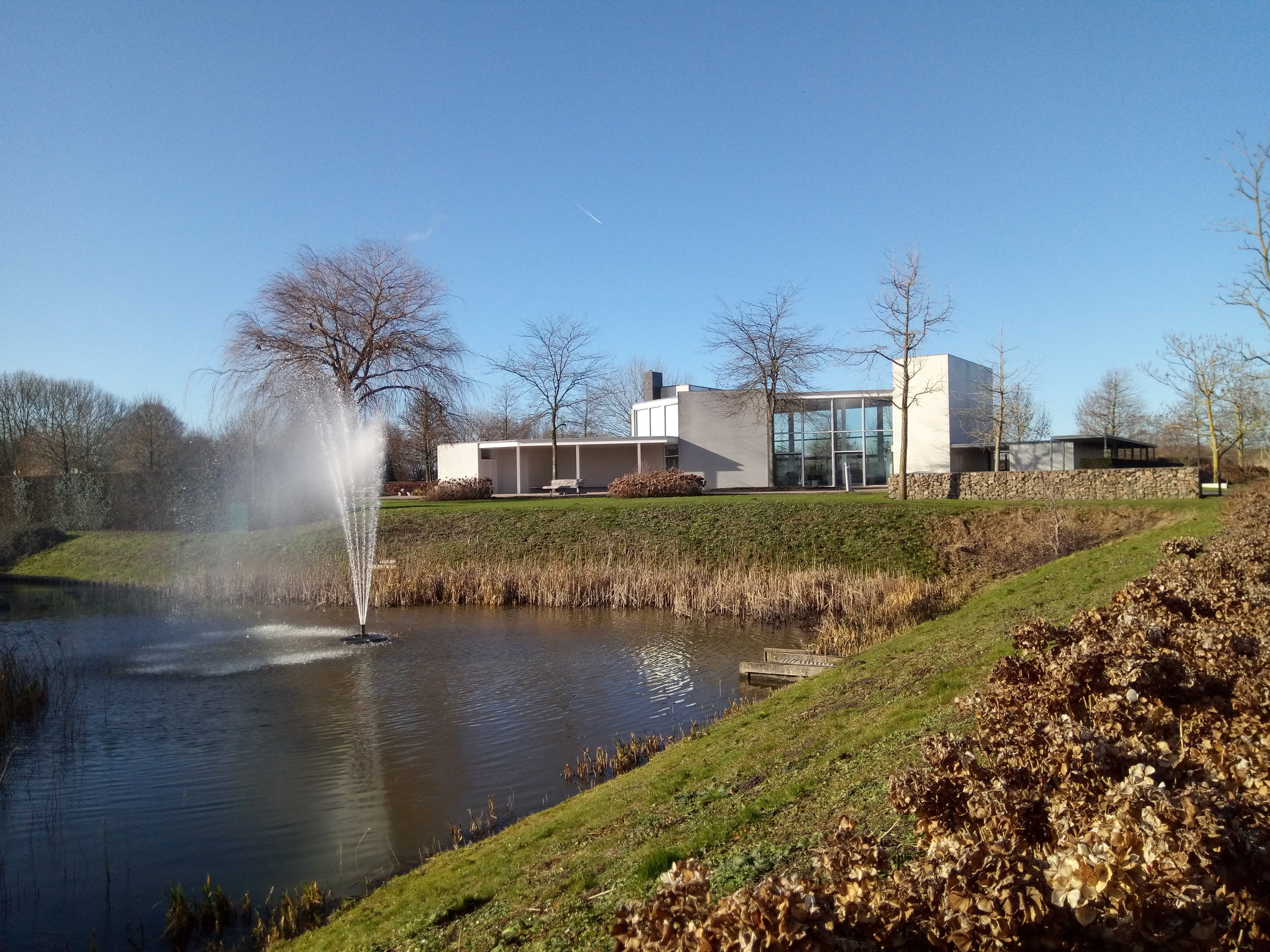
- Villa in Zwaanshoek

- Location in the Netherlands Location in the province of North Holland in the Netherlands
- Coordinates: 52°19′N 4°37′E
- Country: Netherlands
- Province: North Holland
- Municipality: Haarlemmermeer

Area
  - Total: 6.52 km^{2} (2.52 sq mi)
- Elevation: −3.8 m (−12 ft)

Population (2021)
  - Total: 2.040
  - Density: 0.313/km^{2} (0.810/sq mi)
- Time zone: UTC+1 (CET)
  - Summer (DST): UTC+2 (CEST)
- Postal code: 2136
- Dialing code: 023

Zwaanshoek is a village in the Dutch province of North Holland. It is a part of the municipality of Haarlemmermeer, and lies about 4 km west of Hoofddorp. On the other side of the canal lies the village of Bennebroek, which is connected to Zwaanshoek by a bridge.

In 2001, the village of Zwaanshoek had 1250 inhabitants. In 2008, this had increased to 1780 inhabitants. The built-up area of the town was 0.26 km^{2}, and contained 450 residences. The wider statistical area of Zwaanshoek has a population of around 1660.

Zwaanshoek is located on the edge of what used to be a lake, the Haarlemmermeer (which means lake of Haarlem”. This lake had been reclaimed and the Haarlemmermeerpolder was thus created.

Until the 1950s the village did not have an official name and was called Bennebroekerbuurt, which means neighbourhood of Bennebroek. Later, this name was changed to Zwaanshoek, which means swan corner, because of the number of wild swans that were to be found. Initially, Zwaanshoek was just a small line of buildings along the dyke circling the Haarlemmermeer and along the road leading into the polder. In the 1970s and 80’s the village got bigger, when new buildings were constructed. New streets were built on the field of farmer van Leeuwen.

In this new little district, a public school was built for kids of around 4 to 10 years old: de Zwanebloem. Predating this school, the village had another one, called school 8, because it was the eighth school of the Haarlemmermeer. Although school 8 isn’t used as a school anymore, it is now used as a village house, called de Oase (meaning the oasis). Here, different kinds of activities get hosted now, and Bridgeclub Zwaanshoek is one of the permanent users of the house. In 2003, a graveyard got opened in Zwaanshoek, called Meerterpen. This is meant to be used as a central graveyard for the entire Haarlemmermeer and replaces the graveyard in the northern part of Hoofddorp. No new graves could be dug there, because of the expanding airport Schiphol.

The most important sports club is the tennisclub, established in 1976. A famous inhabitant of Zwaanshoek was Jan van Dooyeweerd. This horsetrainer had a company located on the Spieringweg. Van Dooyeweerd had been national champion multiple times and had won 2251 competitions. He died in 2005 and his son, Jan van Dooyeweerd junior, has continued the work of his father.

Zwaanshoek was officially the smartest village of the Netherlands. 23% of 163 inhabitants between the ages of 18 and 27 goes to university. No other village or even city scores higher than this village. (source: VU)
