= Beinsdorp =

- Village
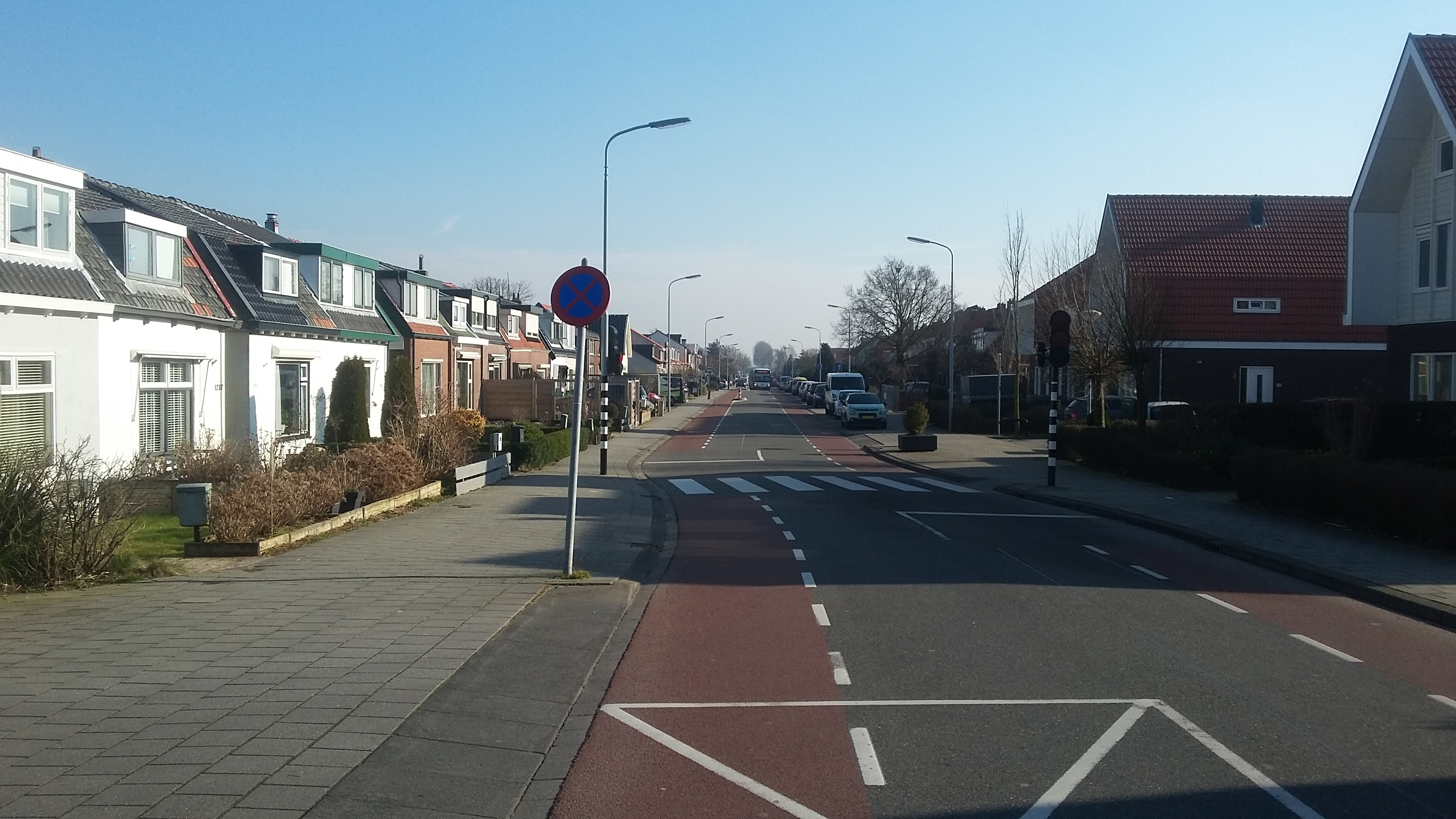

- Location in the Netherlands Location in the province of North Holland in the Netherlands
- Coordinates: 52°17′N 4°35′E
- Country: Netherlands
- Province: North Holland
- Municipality: Haarlemmermeer

Area
  - Total: 2.41 km^{2} (0.93 sq mi)
- Elevation: −3.2 m (−10 ft)

Population (2021)
  - Total: 995
  - Density: 413/km^{2} (1,070/sq mi)
- Time zone: UTC+1 (CET)
  - Summer (DST): UTC+2 (CEST)
- Postal code: 2144
- Dialing code: 0252

Beinsdorp (Dutch pronunciation: [ˈbɛinzdɔr(ə)p]) is a village in the Dutch province of North Holland. It is a part of the municipality of Haarlemmermeer, and lies about 7 kilometres (4.3 mi) southwest of Hoofddorp along the Ringvaart, adjacent to Hillegom. Beinsdorp is named after a former island in the former Haarlemmer Lake.

The village was first mentioned in 1851 as Beinsdorp, and means "Ben's village".

== Gallery ==
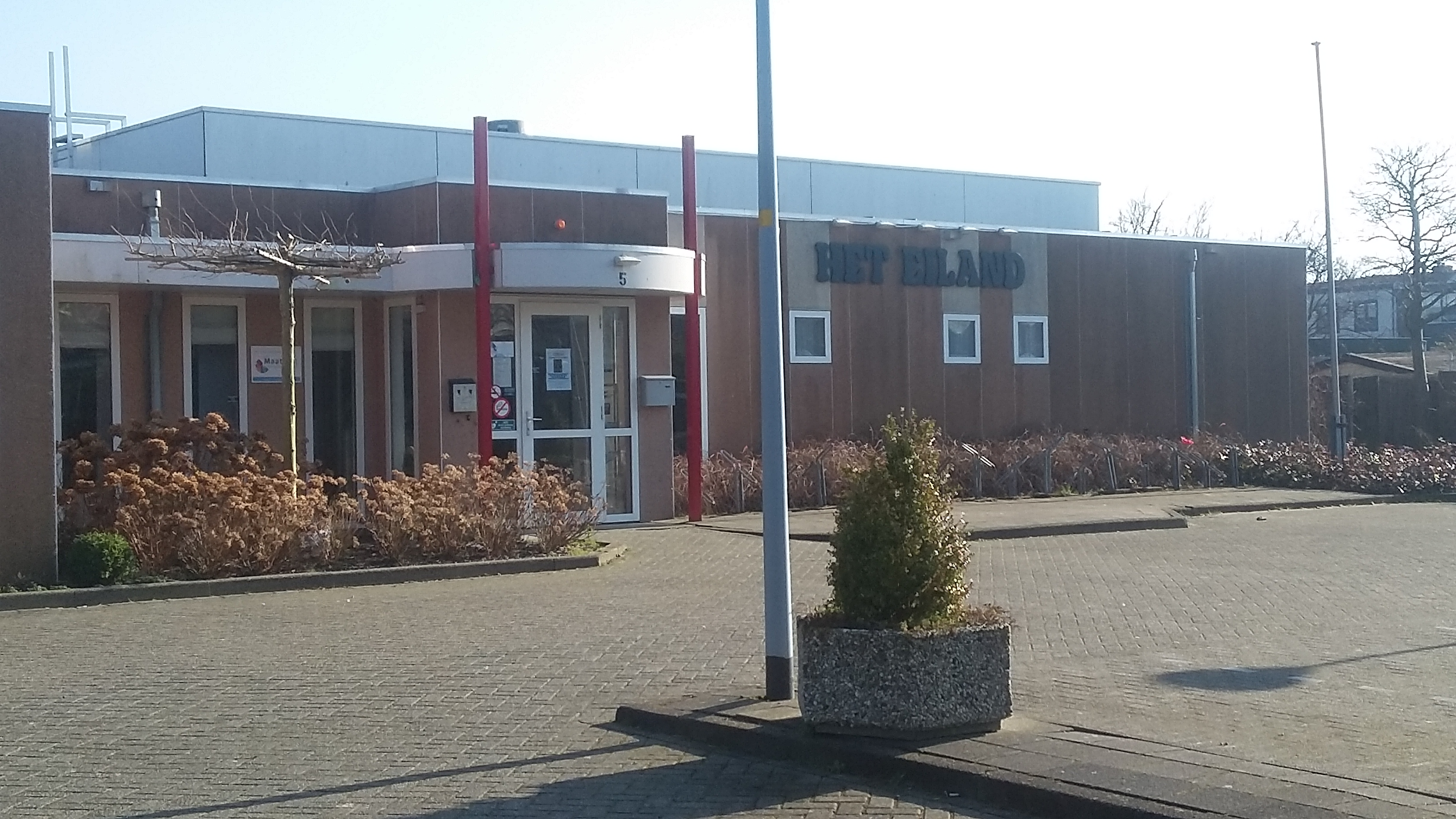
Village house

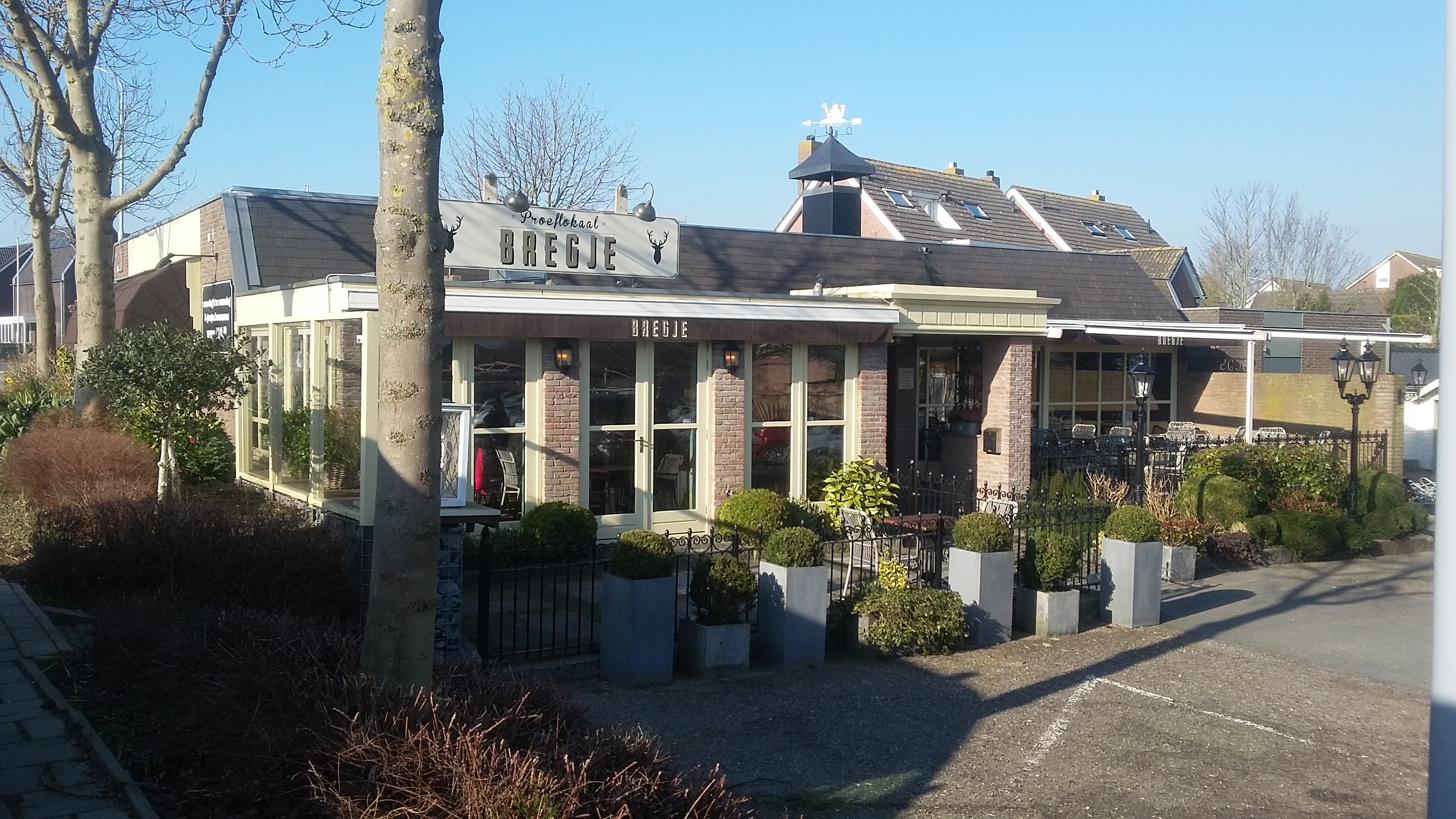
Restaurant in Beinsdorp

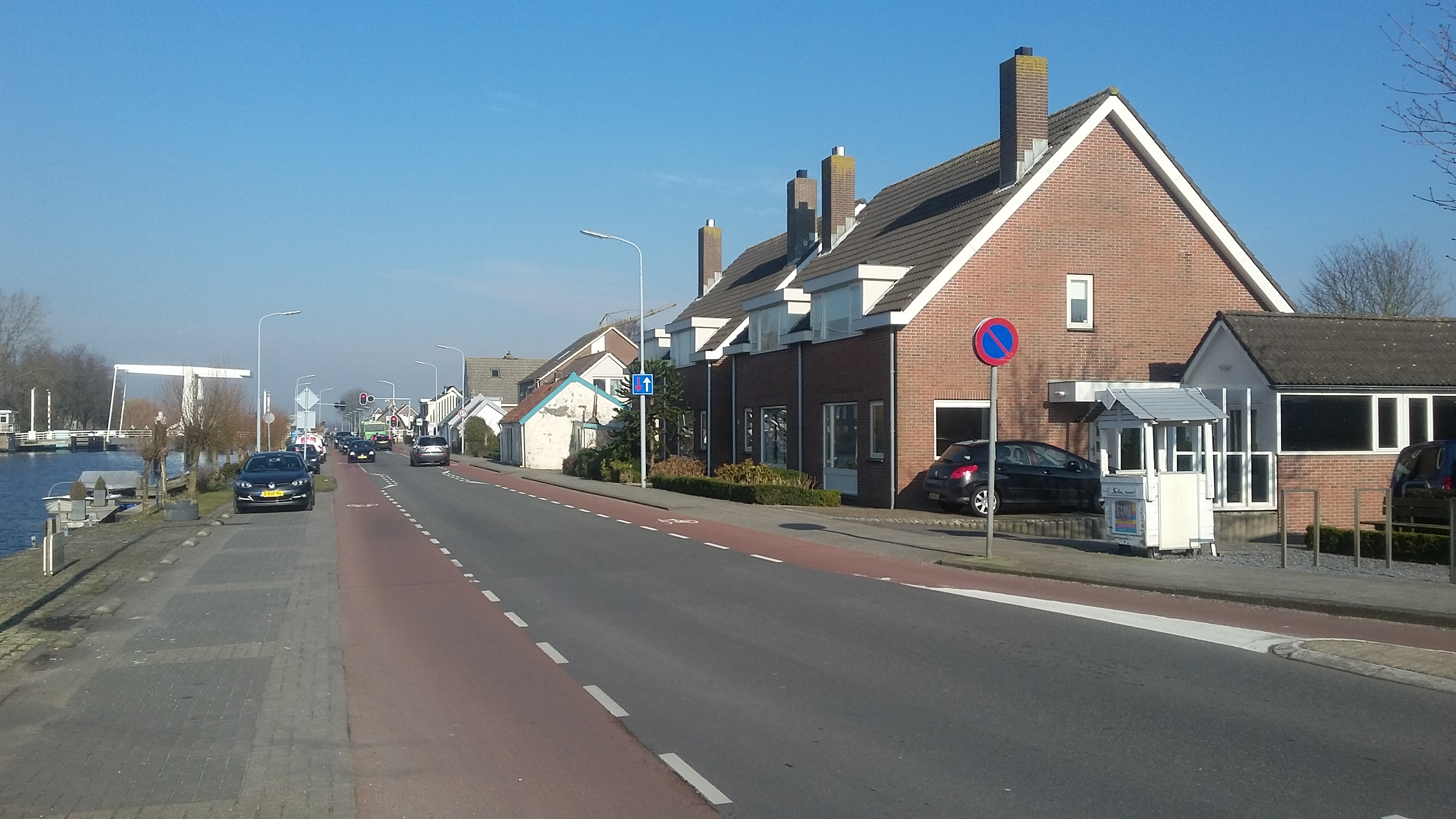

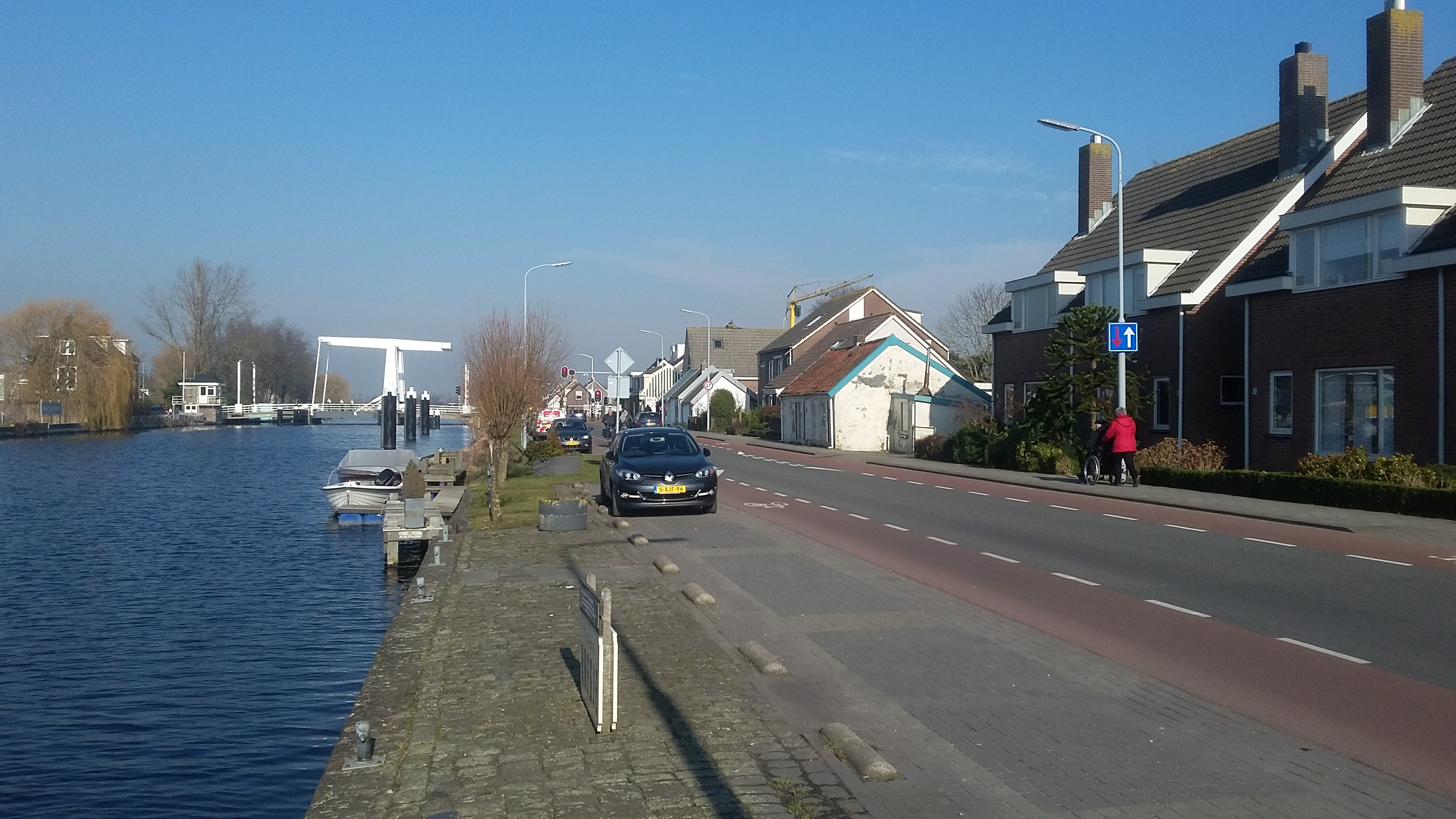
Next to the river

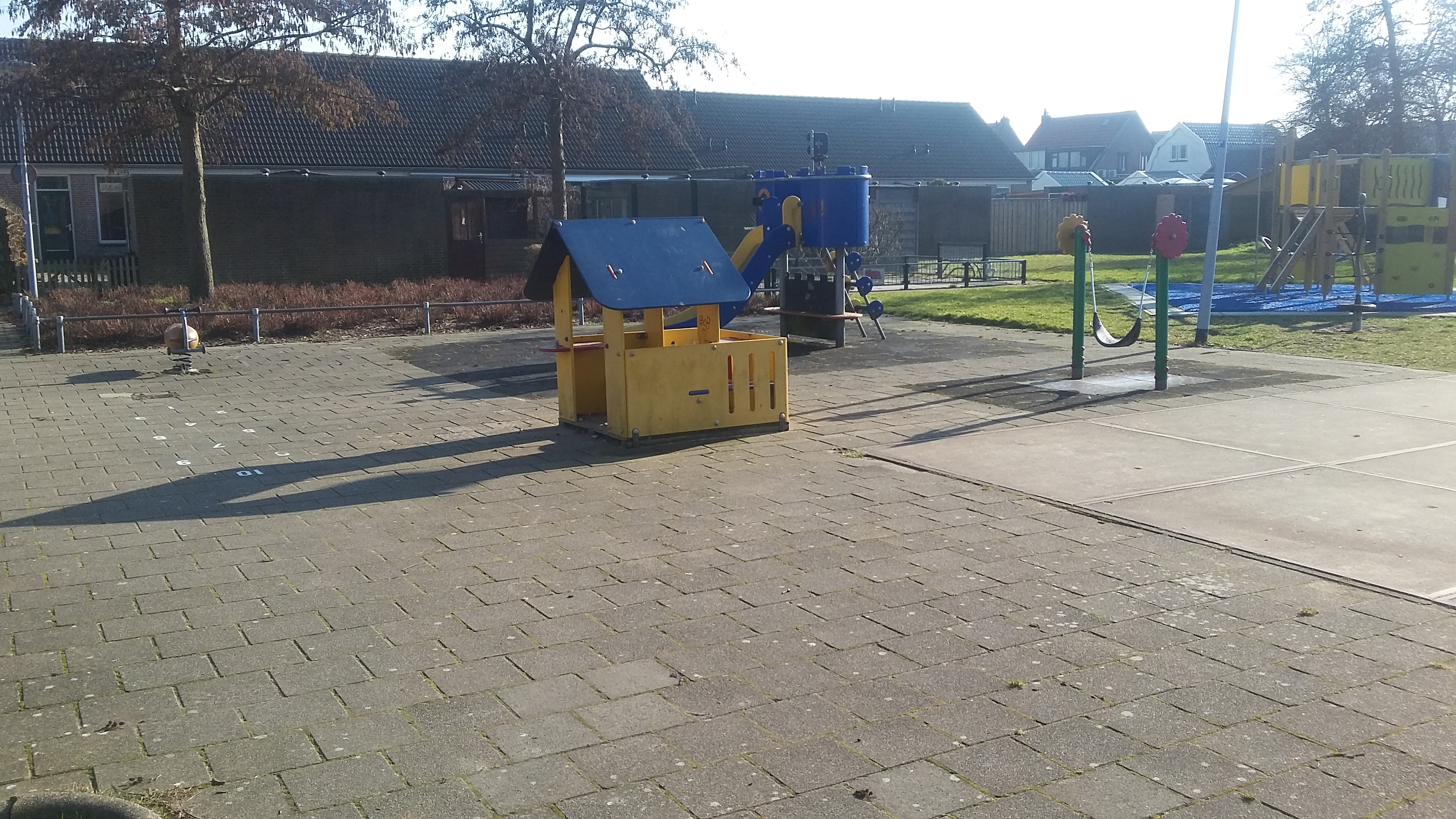
Playground
