= Lijnden =

- Village
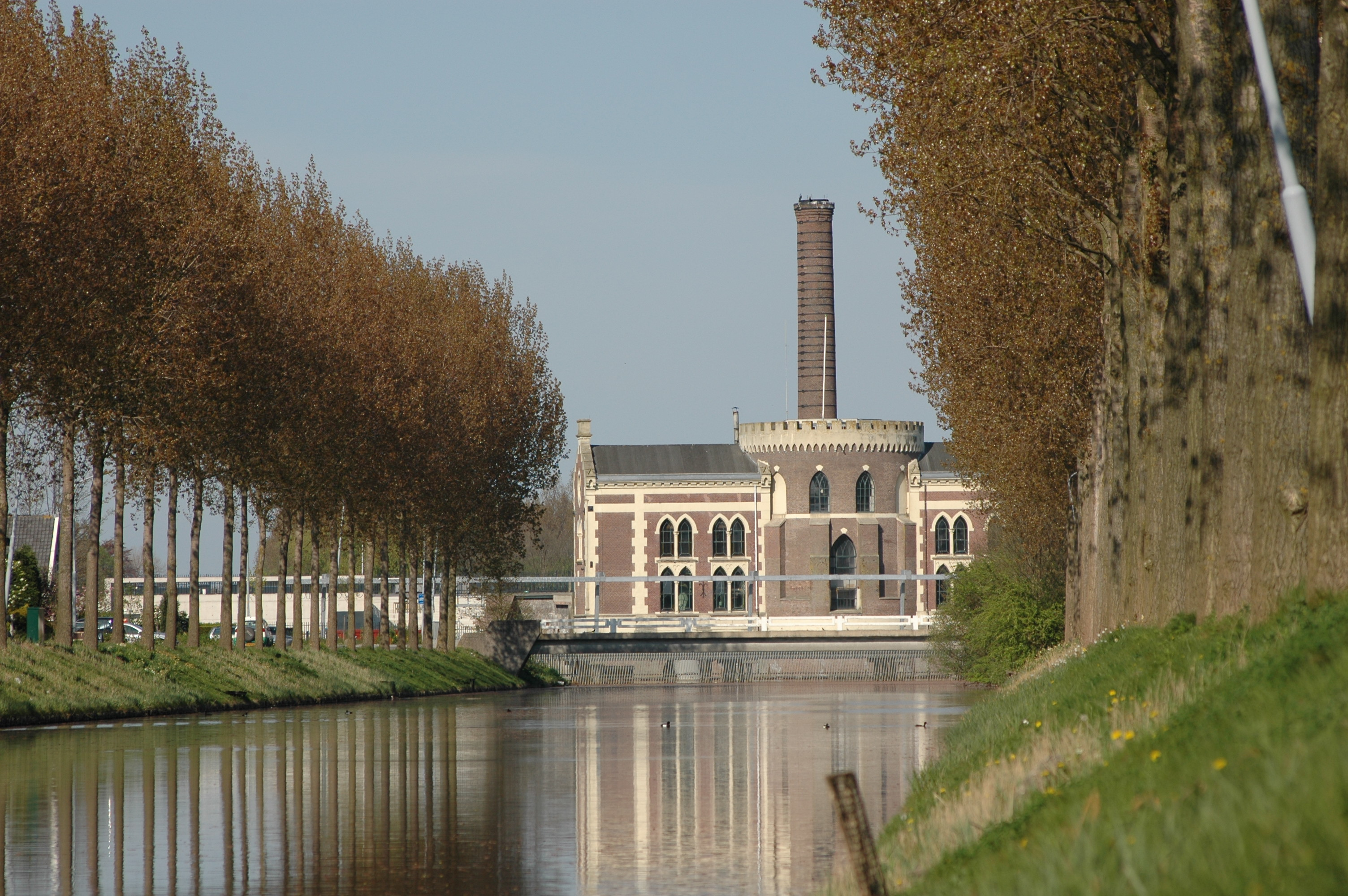
- Pumping station Lijnden

- Location in the Netherlands Location in the province of North Holland in the Netherlands
- Coordinates: 52°21′N 4°45′E
- Country: Netherlands
- Province: North Holland
- Municipality: Haarlemmermeer

Area
  - Total: 7.46 km^{2} (2.88 sq mi)
- Elevation: −3.8 m (−12 ft)

Population (2021)
  - Total: 865
  - Density: 116/km^{2} (300/sq mi)
- Time zone: UTC+1 (CET)
  - Summer (DST): UTC+2 (CEST)
- Postal code: 1175
- Dialing code: 023

Lijnden is a village in the Dutch province of North Holland. It is a part of the municipality of Haarlemmermeer, and lies about 10 km west of Amsterdam.

== History ==
Lijnden or 'de Lijnden' is named after one of the three pumping stations, who reclaimed the municipality of Haarlemmermeer between 1848 and 1852. The village was first mentioned in 1867. Lijnden refers to Frans van Lynden van Hemmen who outlined the plan for the poldering of the Haarlemmermeer lake. Lijnden developed shortly after 1852 at the intersection of the Hoofdvaart with the Ringdijk.

The Catholic St Franciscus van Sales Church is a three aisled church with wooden tower which was built between 1858 and 1860 in neoclassic style. The Dutch Reformed church is an aisleless church with ridge turret which was built in 1936 and is connected to the clergy house.

Lijnden located the oldest (primary) school of the municipality of Haarlemmermeer: School 1. This school, established in 1861, was closed again in 1994 because of a lack of pupils.

Corendon Dutch Airlines has its head office in Lijnden. Lijnden also has the Amsterdam branch office of Corendon Airlines.

== Gallery ==
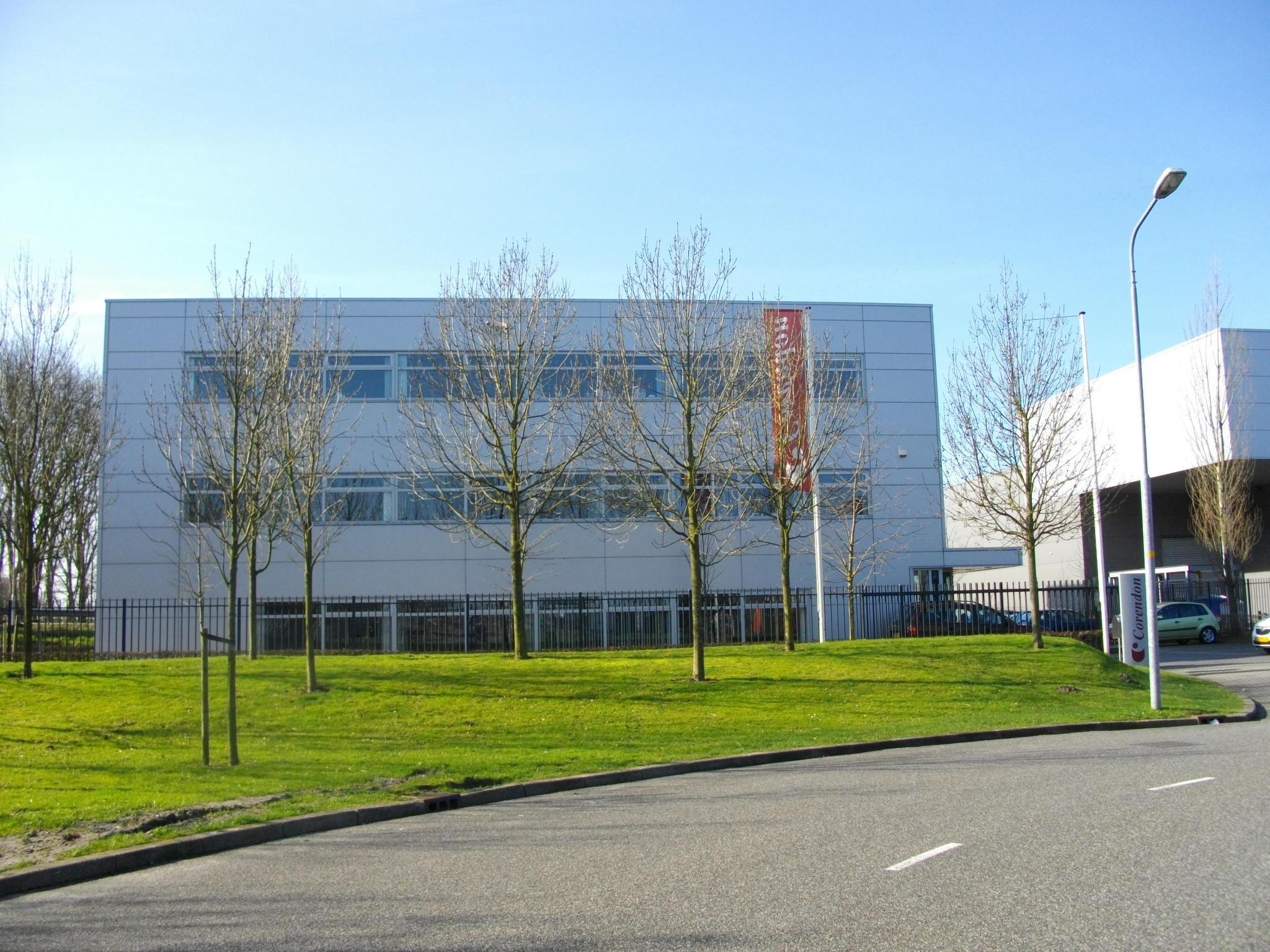
Head office of Corendon Dutch Airlines and the Amsterdam branch office of Corendon Airlines

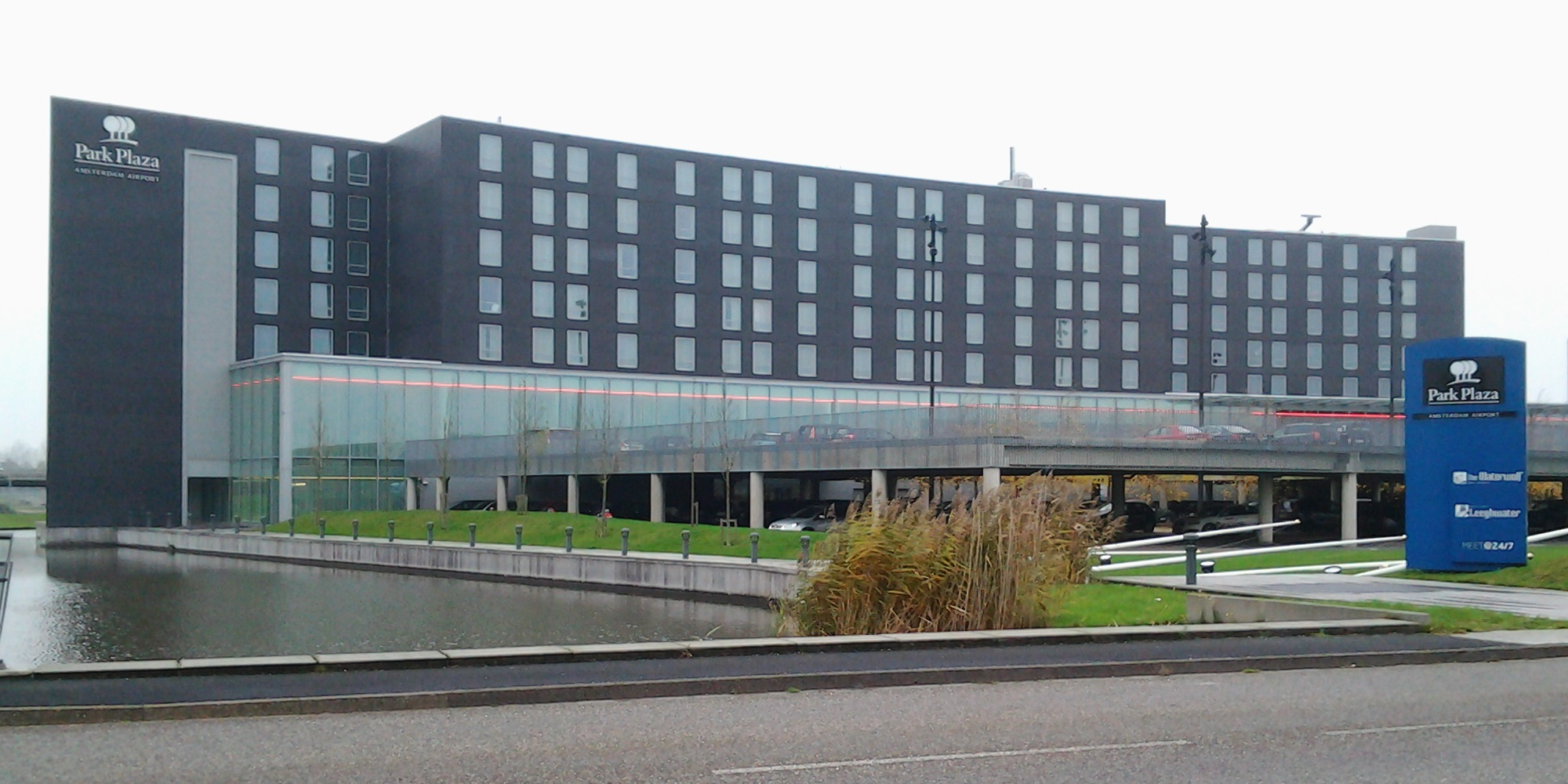
Hotel in Lijnden

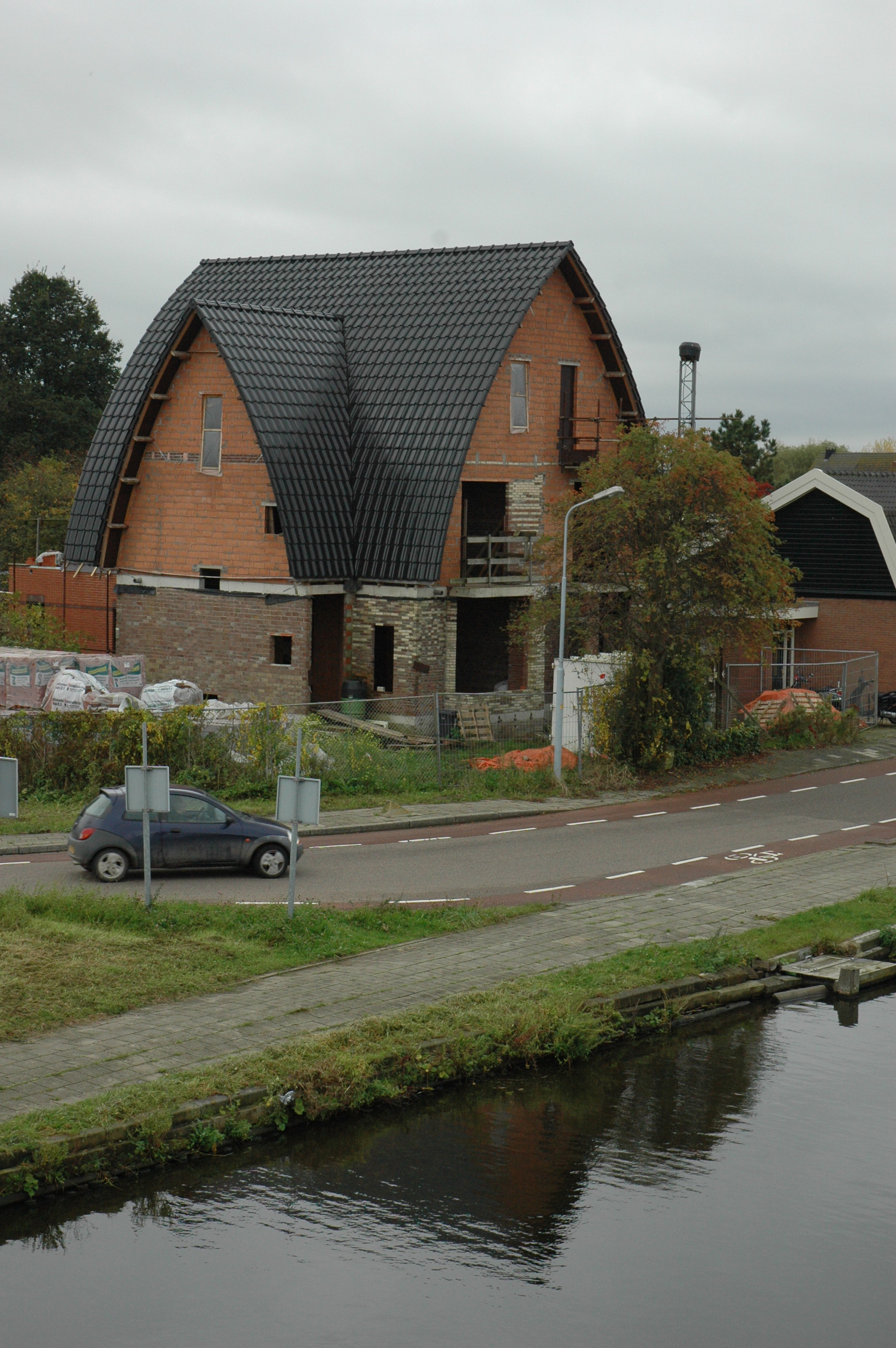
House in Lijnden

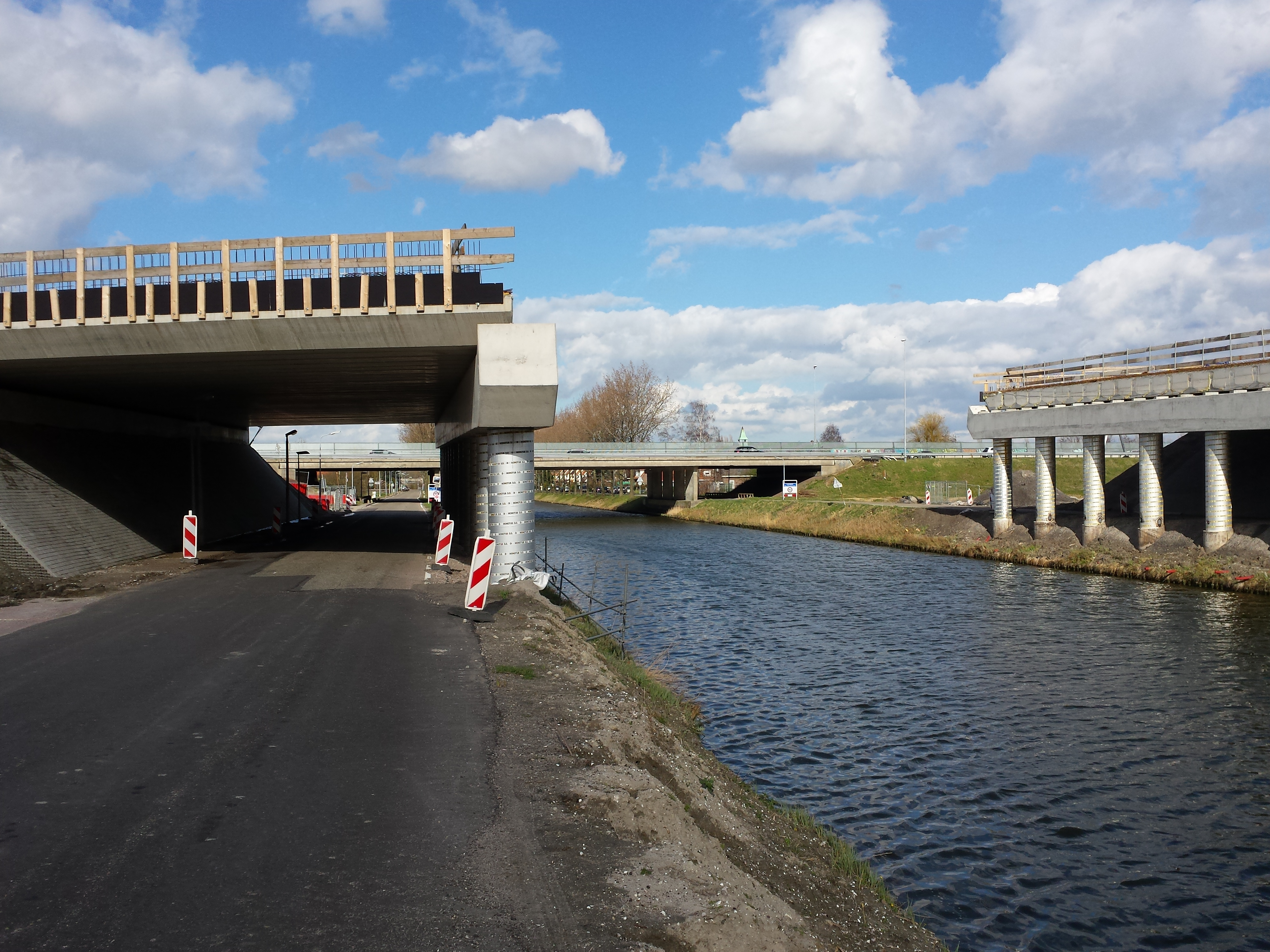
Road construction
