= Leimuiderbrug =

- Hamlet
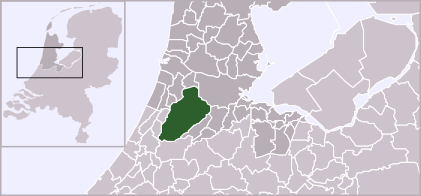

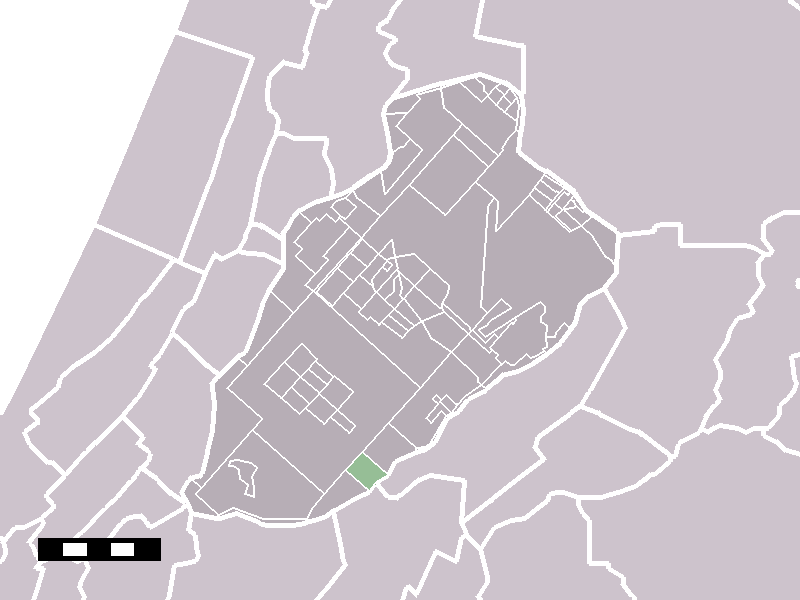
- Leimuiderbrug in the municipality of Haarlemmermeer.
- Coordinates: 52°14′N 4°40′E
- Country: Netherlands
- Province: North Holland
- Municipality: Haarlemmermeer
- Time zone: UTC+1 (CET)
  - Summer (DST): UTC+2 (CEST)
- Postal code: 2155 ..
- Dialing code: 0172

Leimuiderbrug is a hamlet in the Dutch province of North Holland. It is a part of the municipality of Haarlemmermeer, and lies about 11 km west of Amsterdam.

Leimuiderbrug has a population of around 40.
