= Nieuwe Meer =

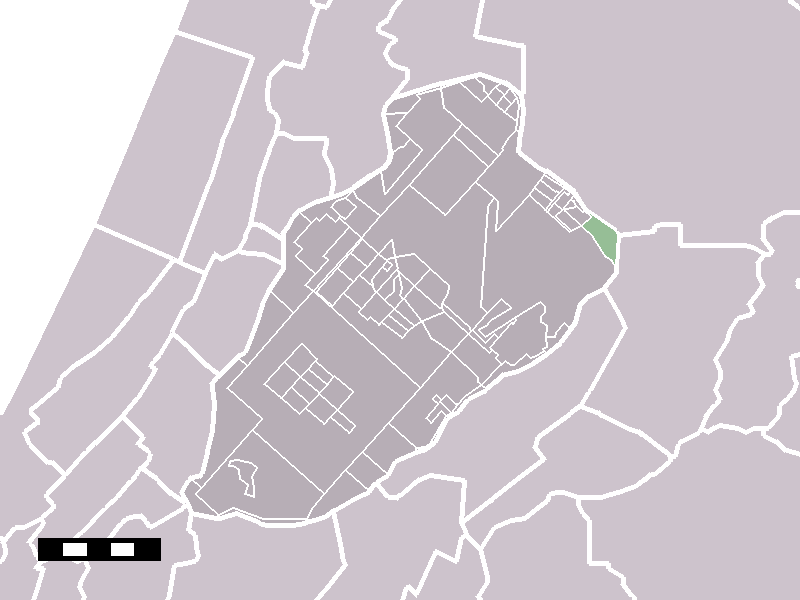
- Nieuwe Meer in the municipality of Haarlemmermeer.

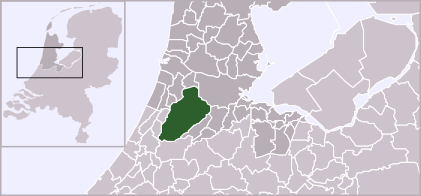
- Coordinates: 52°20′N 4°49′E
- Country: Netherlands
- Province: North Holland
- Municipality: Haarlemmermeer

Nieuwe Meer is a hamlet in the Dutch province of North Holland. It is a part of the municipality of Haarlemmermeer, and lies about 8 km southwest of Amsterdam.

Nieuwe Meer has a population of around 410.

Nieuwe Meer is originally the name of the adjacent small lake which lies within Amsterdam city borders.
