= Boesingheliede =

Coordinates: 52°22′N 4°44′E

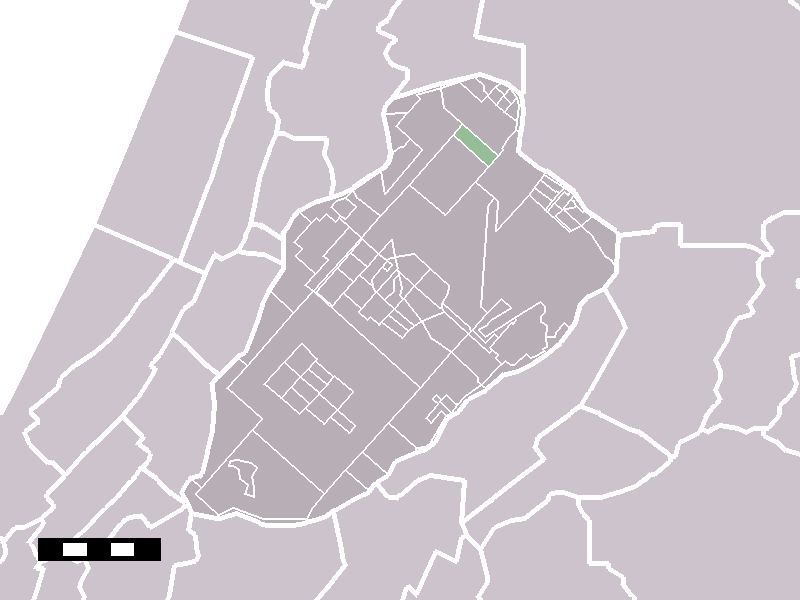
- Boesingheliede in the municipality of Haarlemmermeer

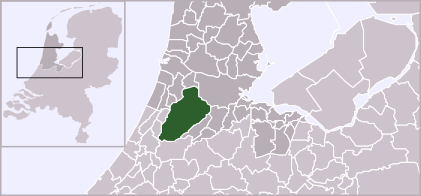
- Country: Netherlands
- Province: North Holland
- Municipality: Haarlemmermeer

Population
  - Total: 140

Boesingheliede (Dutch pronunciation: [ˌbuzɪŋəˈlidə]) is a hamlet in the Dutch province of North Holland. It is a part of the municipality of Haarlemmermeer, and lies about 12 km west of Amsterdam.

Boesingheliede has a population of around 140.
