= Nieuwebrug, North Holland =

Nieuwebrug
- Hamlet
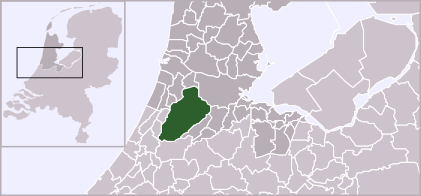

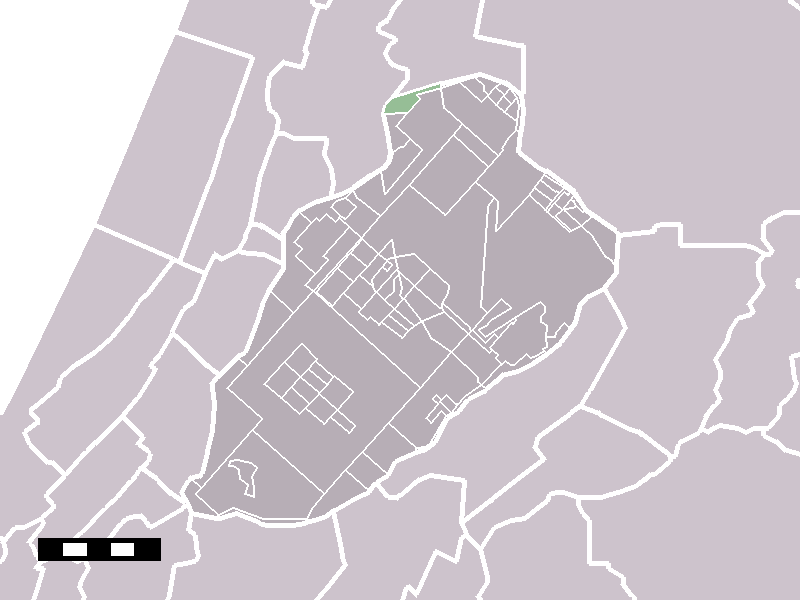
- Nieuwebrug in the municipality of Haarlemmermeer.
- Coordinates: 52°17′N 4°36′E
- Country: Netherlands
- Province: North Holland
- Municipality: Haarlemmermeer

Population
  - Total: 325
- Time zone: UTC+1 (CET)
  - Summer (DST): UTC+2 (CEST)
- Postal code: 2141 ..
- Dialing code: 023

Nieuwebrug is a hamlet in the western Netherlands. It is located in the municipality of Haarlemmermeer, North Holland, about 11 km west of Amsterdam.

Nieuwebrug has a population of around 360.
