= Raymond van Driel =

Dutch footballer

Personal information
- Date of birth: 28 July 1983 (age 43)
- Place of birth: Rotterdam, Netherlands
- Height: 1.84 m (6 ft 0 in)
- Position: Goalkeeper

Youth career
- 1998–2003: Vitesse

Senior career*
Years	Team	Apps	(Gls)
2004–2006	AGOVV	3	(0)
2006–2007	Vitesse	0	(0)
2007–2008	VVV	1	(0)
- * Club domestic league appearances and goals as of November 2, 2007

Raymond van Driel (born 28 July 1983) is a Dutch retired professional footballer.

== Club career ==
His last professional club was Eredivisie side VVV, whom he had joined in 2007. Van Driel is a goalkeeper, who was born in Rotterdam and made his debut in professional football, being part of the AGOVV squad in the 2005-06 season where he played before joining Vitesse.

He later turned to amateur football, playing for Arnhemia, RKHVV and AWC.
