= Jan van Driel =

Dutch science education researcher

Academic background
- Education: PhD, Utrecht University (1990)
- Thesis: Betrokken bij evenwicht (1990)
- Doctoral advisor: Wobbe de Vos

Academic work
- Discipline: Science education
- Institutions: Delft University of Technology; Leiden University; University of Melbourne
- Main interests: Science teacher knowledge, pedagogical content knowledge, teacher education

Jan Hendrik van Driel is a Dutch science education researcher. He was Professor of Science Education at the University of Melbourne, where he co-led the Mathematics, Science and Technology Education Group in the Faculty of Education, and is now an Honorary Professorial Fellow there. His research concerns the professional knowledge of science teachers, in particular pedagogical content knowledge, and teacher education and professional learning. From 2016 to 2022 he was editor-in-chief of the International Journal of Science Education.

== Education ==
Van Driel taught chemistry in secondary schools before moving into research. He received his PhD in chemical education from Utrecht University in 1990. His thesis, supervised by Wobbe de Vos, examined how secondary school students develop an understanding of chemical equilibrium.

== Career ==
After his doctorate, van Driel worked as a teacher trainer and educational consultant at Delft University of Technology. In 1995 he joined ICLON, the Leiden University Graduate School of Teaching, where he was appointed Professor of Science Education in 2006. He later served as director of ICLON. He later became an Honorary Professorial Fellow at the university.

In September 2016, following an international search, van Driel moved to the University of Melbourne as its first Professor of Science Education. The position was created to strengthen science education reform and the preparation of STEM teachers, working with the university's science, engineering and medicine faculties. Since 2023 he has also been an international visiting professor in the Department of Biology Education at the Leibniz Institute for Science and Mathematics Education (IPN) in Kiel.

== Research ==
Van Driel's research sits at the intersection of science education and teacher education. His early work on chemical equilibrium led him to ask what teachers need to know in order to teach a specific topic well. In a 1998 article with Nico Verloop and Wobbe de Vos, he placed pedagogical content knowledge within research on teachers' craft knowledge. The article argued that this knowledge grows mainly through teaching experience and depends on sound subject-matter knowledge. At Leiden he studied how science teachers' knowledge and beliefs change during initial teacher education and in the context of curriculum reform. Results from this work fed directly into ICLON's science teacher education programmes.

His more recent work covers interdisciplinary science and STEM education, science and gender, and the teaching of scientific reasoning and of models and modelling in science. He is a chief investigator on a project funded by the Australian Research Council on primary teachers' adaptive expertise in interdisciplinary mathematics and science education, in collaboration with RMIT University, Monash University and Deakin University.

== Professional service ==
Van Driel was editor-in-chief of the International Journal of Science Education from 2016 to 2022, latterly jointly with M. Gail Jones. In the Netherlands he was vice-president of the Netherlands Educational Research Association from 2001 to 2009. He also chaired the Interuniversity Centre for Teacher Education and served as secretary of the board of the Technasium Foundation.

== Selected works ==
- van Driel, Jan H.; Verloop, Nico; de Vos, Wobbe (1998). "Developing science teachers' pedagogical content knowledge". Journal of Research in Science Teaching. 35 (6): 673–695. doi:10.1002/(SICI)1098-2736(199808)35:6<673::AID-TEA5>3.0.CO;2-J.
- Friedrichsen, Patricia; van Driel, Jan H.; Abell, Sandra K. (2011). "Taking a closer look at science teaching orientations". Science Education. 95 (2): 358–376.
- van Driel, Jan H.; Meirink, Jacobiene A.; van Veen, Klaas; Zwart, Rosanne C. (2012). "Current trends and missing links in studies on teacher professional development in science education: A review of design features and quality of research". Studies in Science Education. 48 (2): 129–160.
- van Driel, Jan H.; Berry, Amanda; Meirink, Jacobiene (2014). "Research on science teacher knowledge". In Lederman, Norman G.; Abell, Sandra K. (eds.). Handbook of Research on Science Education. Vol. II. New York: Routledge. doi:10.4324/9780203097267.
- Upmeier zu Belzen, Annette; van Driel, Jan; Krüger, Dirk, eds. (2019). Towards a Competence-Based View on Models and Modeling in Science Education. Models and Modeling in Science Education. Vol. 12. Cham: Springer. ISBN 978-3-030-30257-3.
- van Driel, Jan H. (2021). Science Teachers' Knowledge Development. Cultural and Historical Perspectives on Science Education: Distinguished Contributors. Leiden: Brill.
