= Sonja van Driel =

Dutch photographer and writer

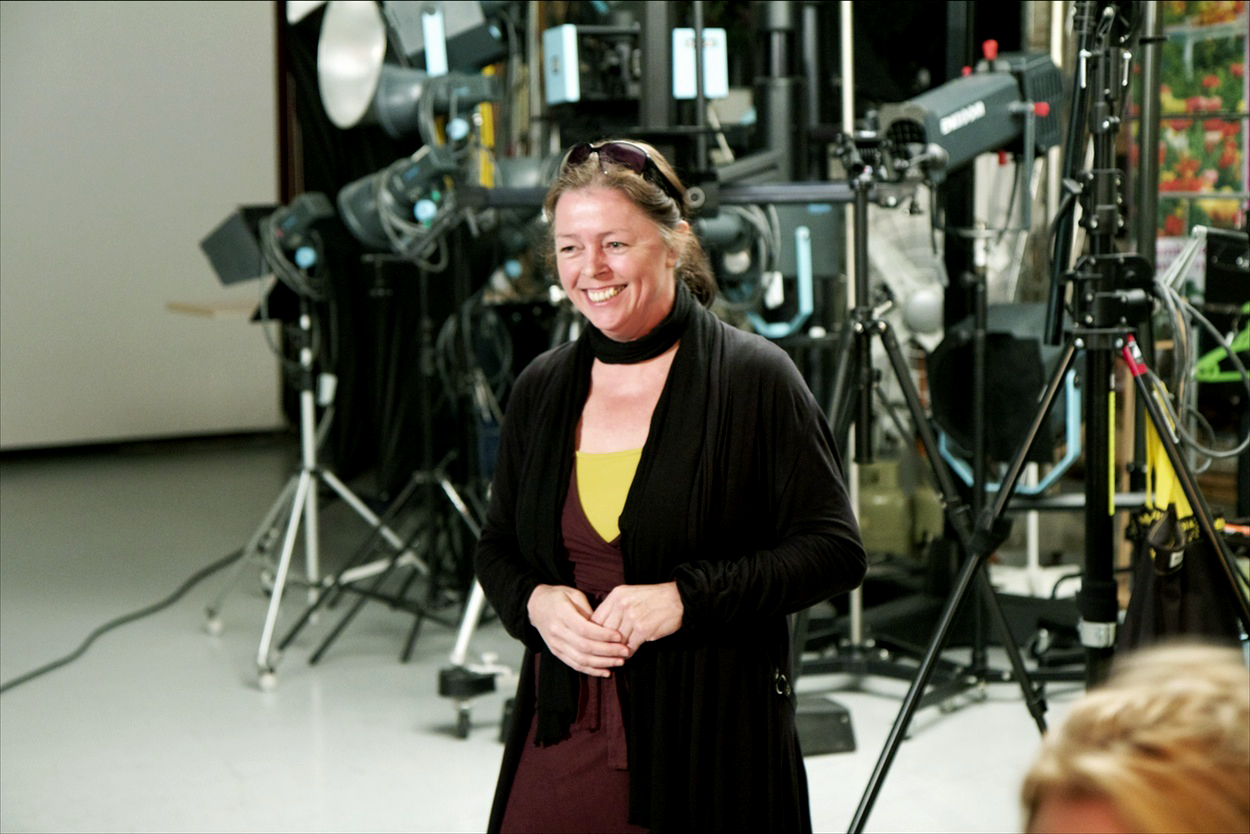
- Born: 1959 (age 66–67); Haarlemmermeer
- Website: sonjavandriel.com

Sonja van Driel (born 15 December 1959, Haarlemmermeer) is a Dutch photographer and writer of educational photography books. She lives and works alternately in the Netherlands and France (Bourgogne).

== Biography ==
In her young years, Sonja worked at Royal Jordanian Airlines. This gave her the opportunity to travel a lot and to live at different places in the world. Her love for photography was sparked by the experiences from her travels.

She educated herself in photography at the Vrije Academie voor Beeldende Kunsten (Academy of Fine Arts) in The Hague.

Sonja began her career as a professional photographer in 1994 for newspapers and magazines, businesses and private individuals. She had publications in Filosofie Magazine, Gay Krant, De Telegraaf and various professional magazines at Sanoma Media.

Sonja tells us: “At the Academy I have learned to look and observe, in practice I have learned about photography and to run my business.”

After 12 years of experience as a photographer, she started giving workshops and lectures to other photographers. Since then, Sonja regularly performed as a guest lecturer for domestic- and foreign photography academies, institutes and organisations. Among other, she spoke at Photoville in New York City, Photography Day in Amsterdam and at the Belgian Federation for Photographers in Brussels.

Sonja writes books about photography- and light exposure techniques, but also about practicing entrepreneurship as a photographer.

She has interviewed photography purchasers at TNT, Shell, Abacapress and many others to find out about the motivations of hiring a specific photographer, or not. She talked to professionals in the photography industry such as Lars Boering at World Press Photo, Anil Ramchand at Corbis Images and successful photographers to identify the do's and don'ts of building a career as a photographer.

== Books ==
Books written in English

2011 – Photographers' Bread and Butter: How to establish your name

2013 – Are you running or ruining your photography business (translated to English by Nancy Van Der Horst) Books written in Dutch

2010 – Ondernemer in Beeld, de weg naar succes als fotograaf (1st edition), 2015 (2nd edition)

2011 – Flitsen met een Reportageflitser, van toevalstreffer naar voltreffer (1st edition), 2014 (2nd edition), 2016 (3rd edition), 2018 (4th edition)

2012 – Opdrachtgever in Beeld, de motieven om voor jou als fotograaf te kiezen

2014 – JA, praktijkboek hedendaagse trouwfotografie

2017 – Praktijkboek Draadloos Flitsen
