= Vlieland =

- Municipality
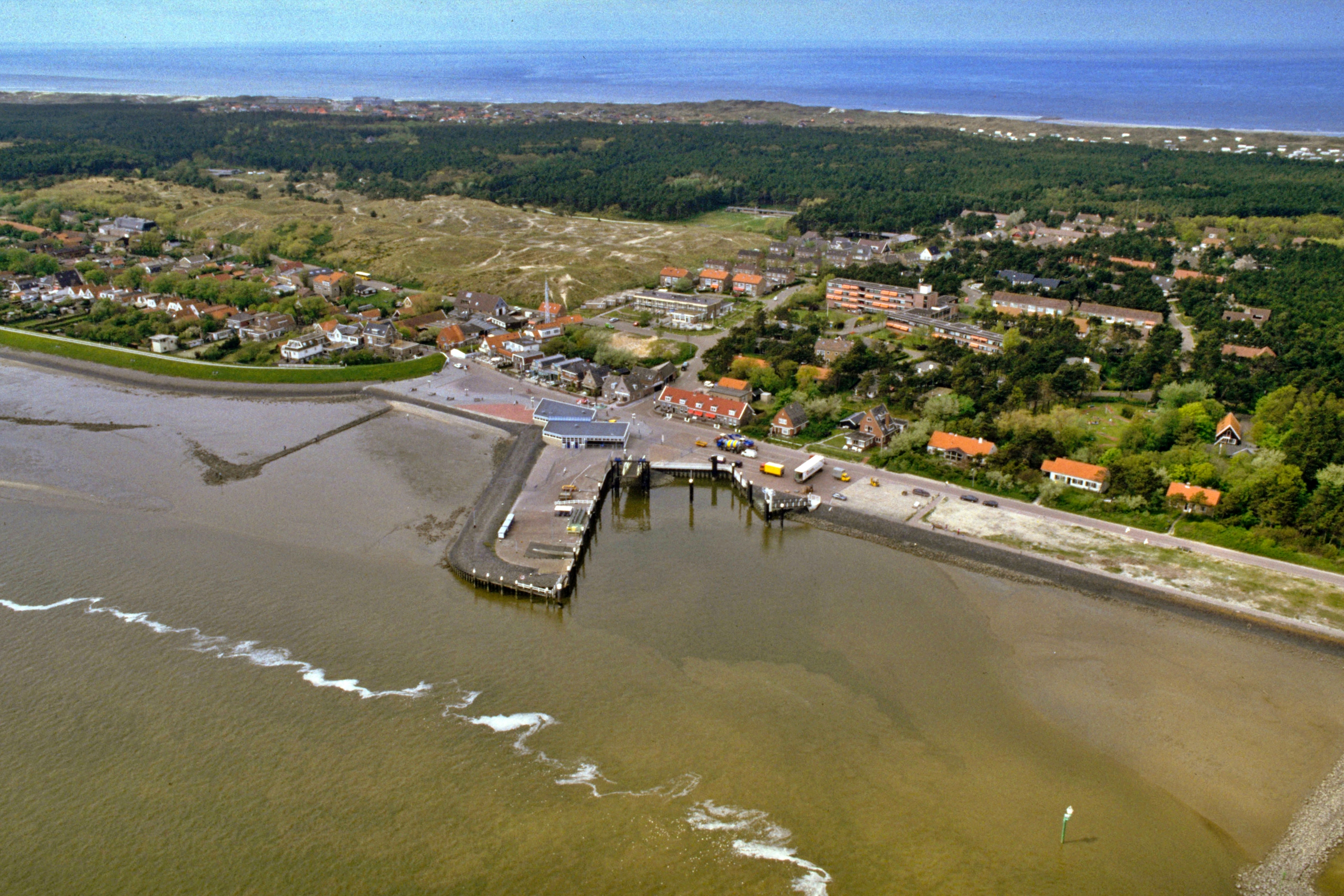
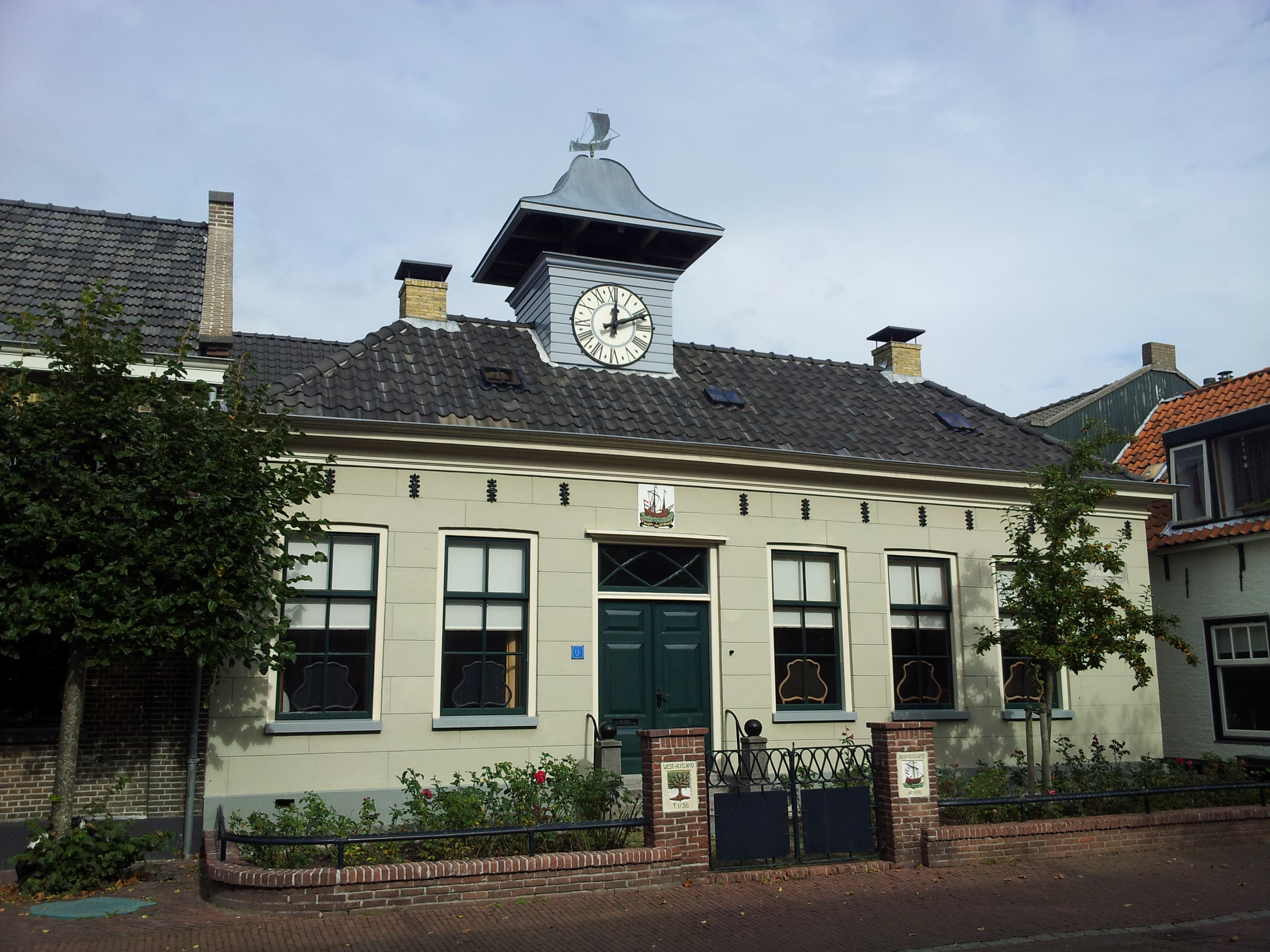
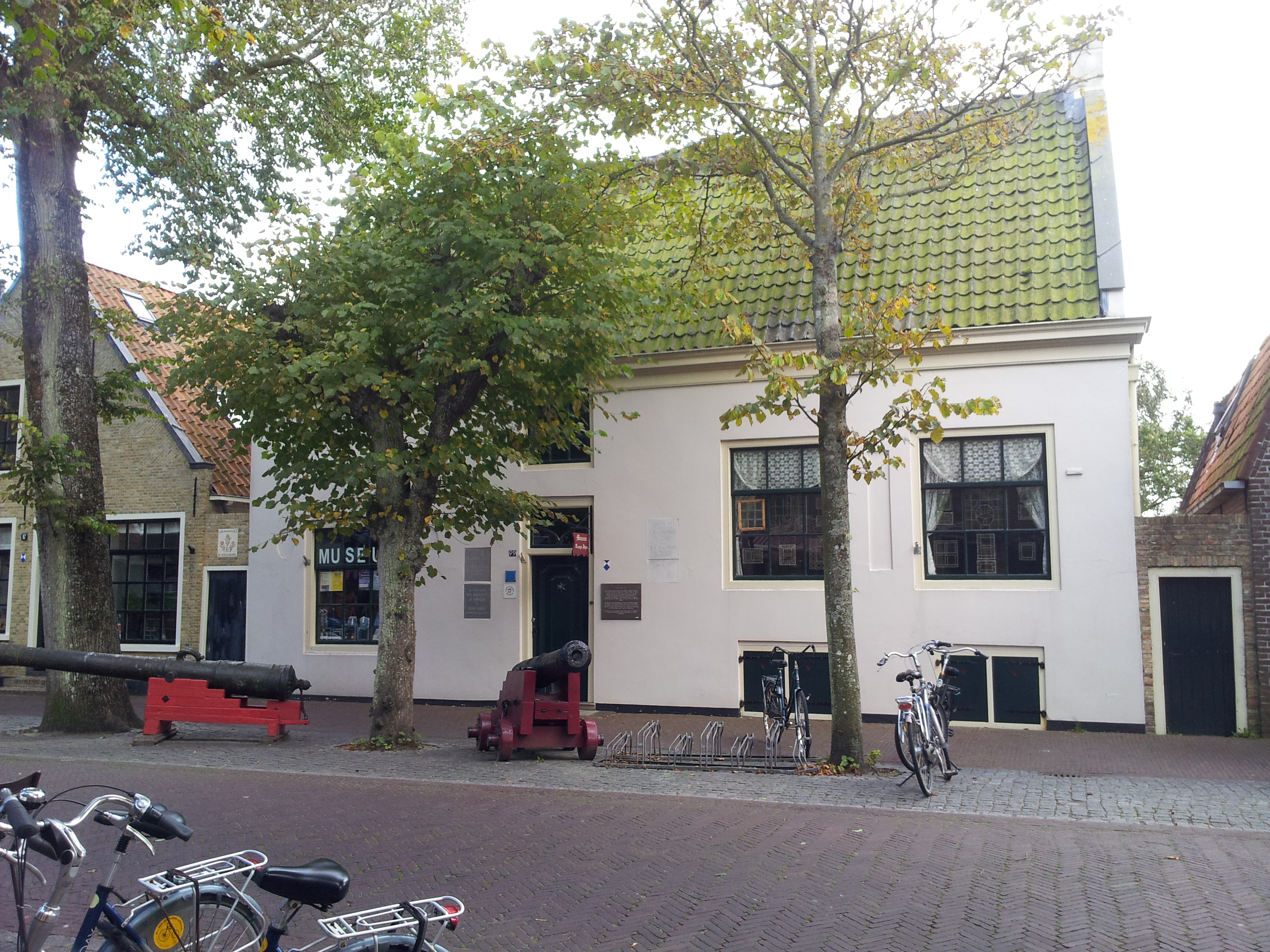
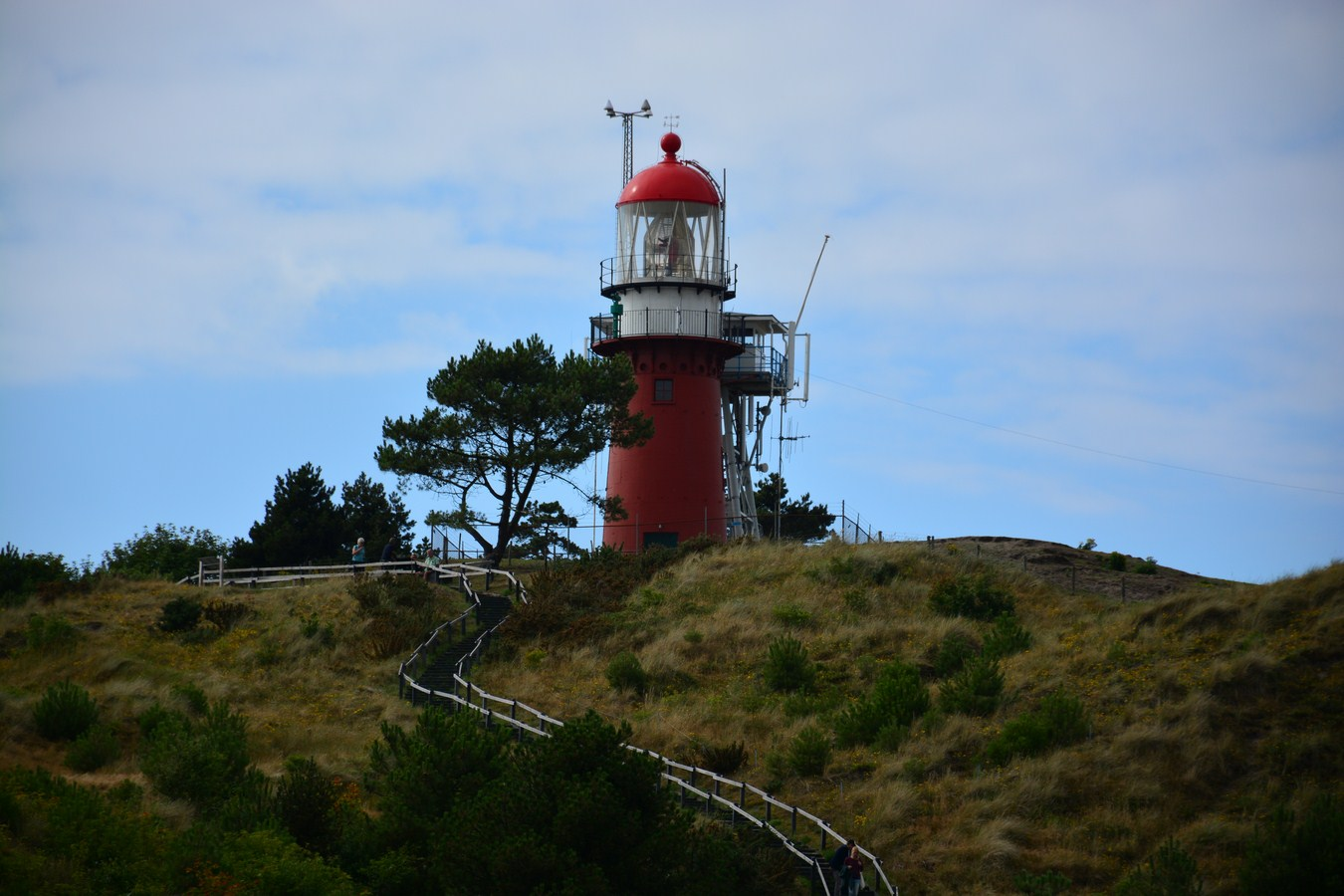
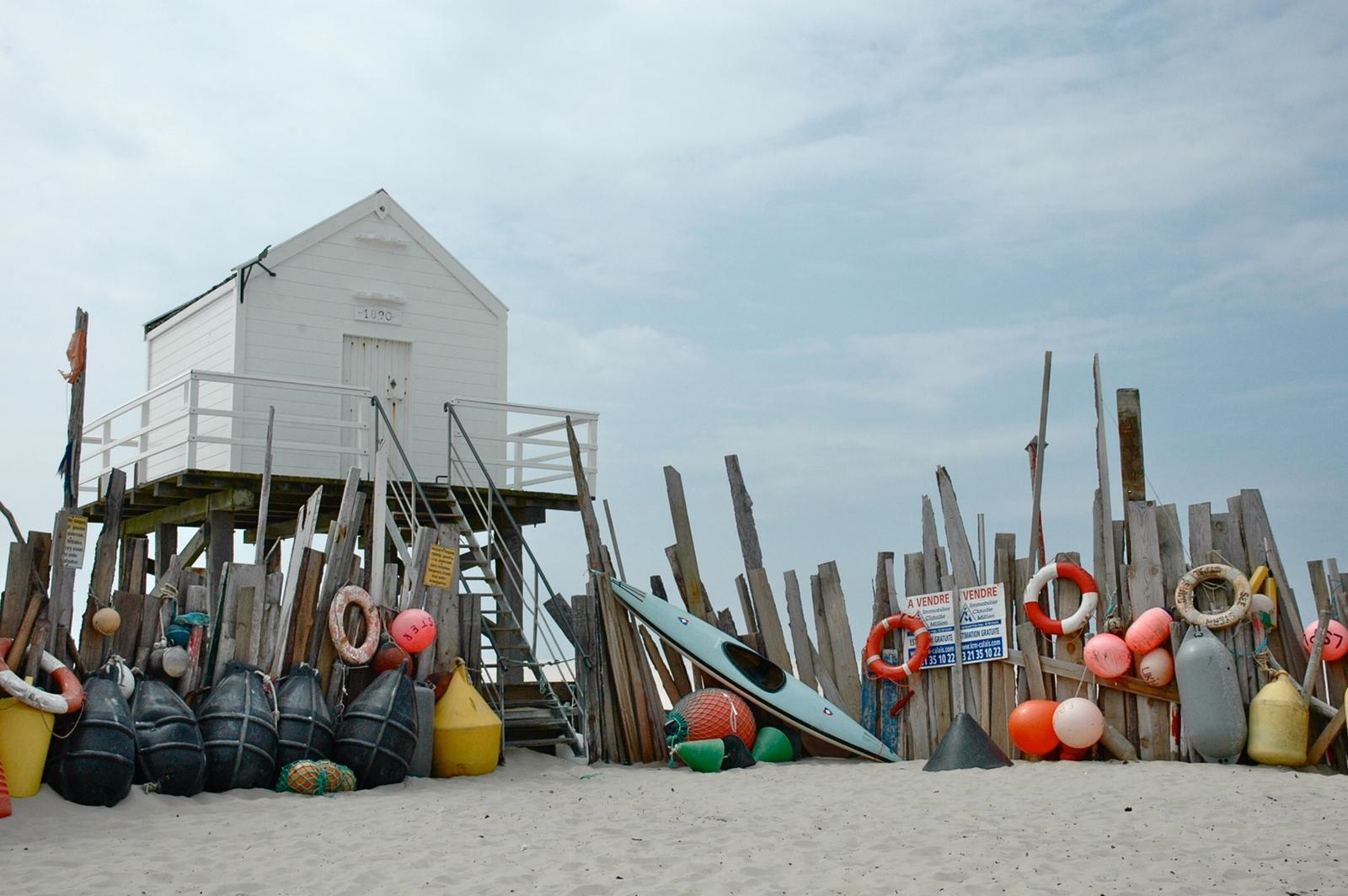
- Ferry wharf Former town hall Museum Tromp's House Vuurduin Lighthouse Emergency shelter for shipwreck victims

- Flag Coat of arms

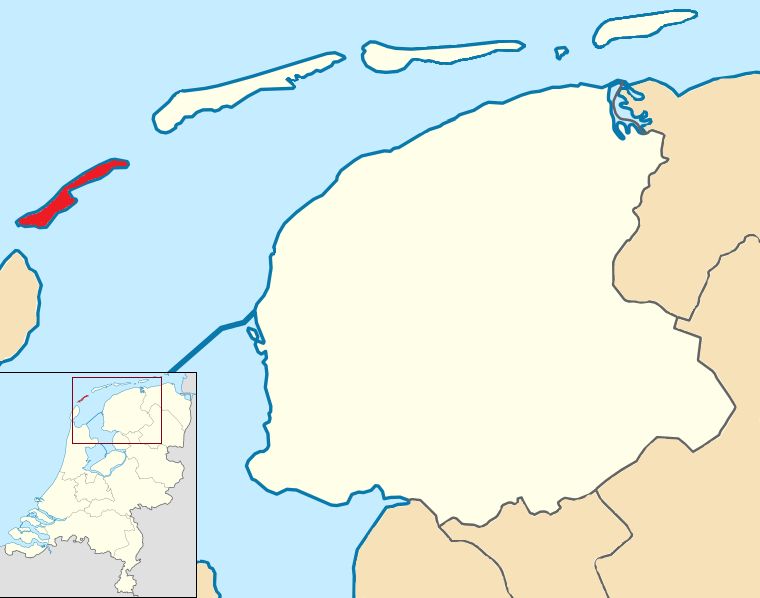
- Location in Friesland
- Coordinates: 53°18′N 5°4′E
- Country: Netherlands
- Province: Friesland

Government
  - Body: Municipal council
  - Mayor: Michiel Schrier (SP)

Area
  - Total: 315.80 km^{2} (121.93 sq mi)
  - Land: 39.15 km^{2} (15.12 sq mi)
  - Water: 276.65 km^{2} (106.82 sq mi)
- Elevation: 3 m (9.8 ft)

Population (January 2021)
  - Total: 1,194
  - Density: 30/km^{2} (78/sq mi)
- Demonym: Vlielander
- Time zone: UTC+1 (CET)
  - Summer (DST): UTC+2 (CEST)
- Postcode: 8899
- Area code: 0562
- Website: www.vlieland.nl

Ramsar Wetland
- Official name: Duinen Vlieland
- Designated: 29 August 2000
- Reference no.: 2216

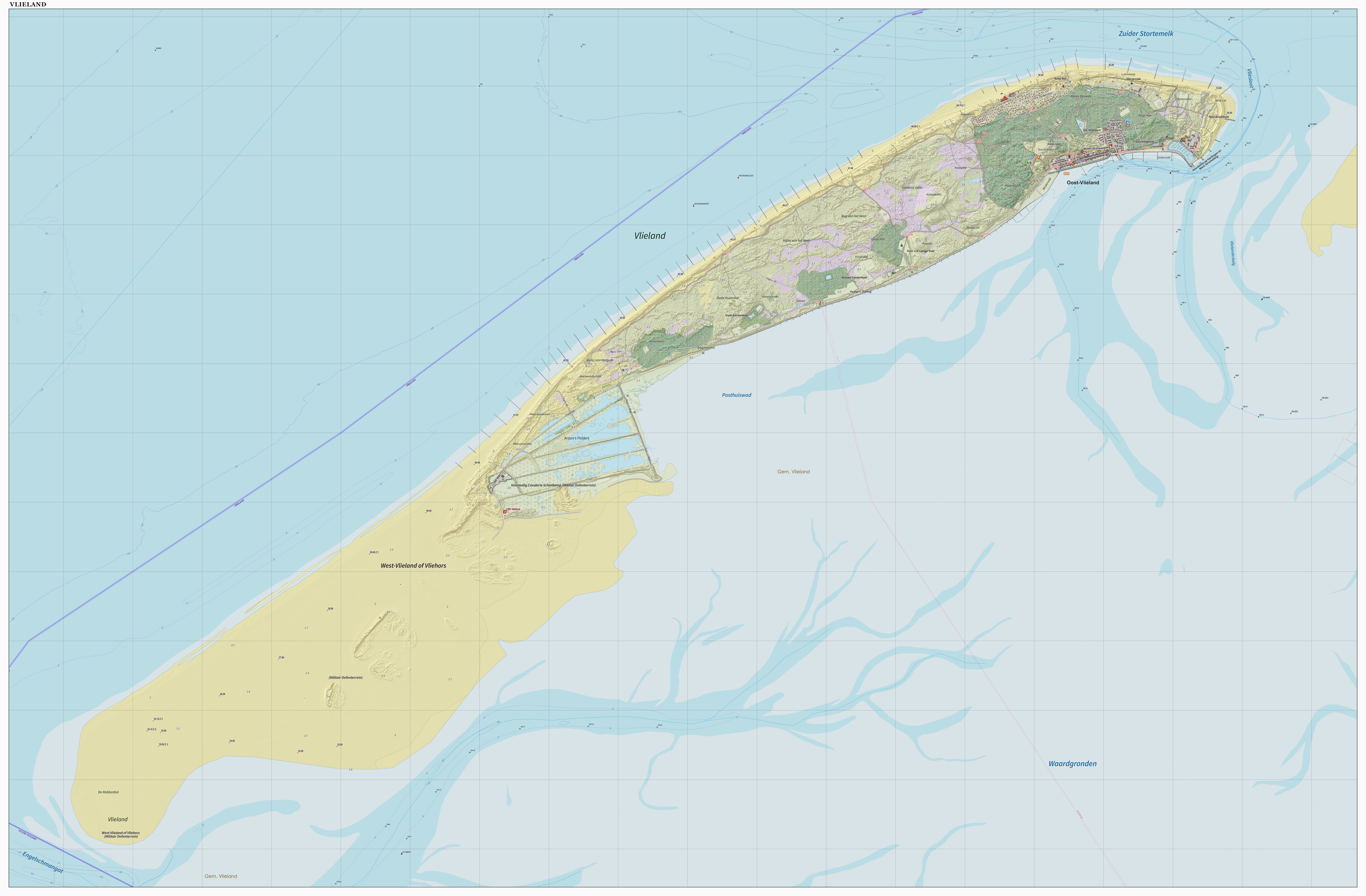
Map of the island of Vlieland, December 2015

Vlieland (Dutch pronunciation: [ˈvlilɑnt]; West Frisian: Flylân [ˈflilɔ̃ːn]) is a municipality and island in the northern Netherlands. The municipality of Vlieland is the second most sparsely populated municipality in the Netherlands, after Schiermonnikoog.

Vlieland is one of the West Frisian Islands, lying in the Wadden Sea. It is the second island from the west in the chain, lying between Texel and Terschelling. The island was permanently separated from the mainland in St. Lucia's flood in 1287. Vlieland was named after the Vlie, the seaway between it and Terschelling that was the estuary of the river IJssel in medieval times. Richel is a permanently dry sandbank, located about 1 kilometre (0.62 mi) east of the northernmost point of Vlieland and is administered by the municipality of Vlieland.

== History ==
The northern part of the island of Texel, Eierland, once was the southwestern part of Vlieland. A storm surge in 1296 probably separated Eierland from Vlieland. Erosion further diminished the size of Vlieland from the west, leading in 1736 to the disappearance of a second village on Vlieland, West-Vlieland (Westeijnde), after the inhabitants had tried for decades to rebuild the town following numerous floods.

During the Second World War, Vlieland became part of the German Atlantic Wall. The occupying German forces built two anti-aircraft batteries and stationed more soldiers on the island than there were inhabitants. In 1942 the islands of Vlieland and Terschelling were transferred from the province of North Holland to Friesland and the situation was not reversed after the war. The mail station in the western part of the island is a reminder that in the past mail was delivered by ferry from Texel.

Because of this history, Vlieland natives do not speak Frisian. The original dialect, Vlielands, was related to the dialect of Texel and to other Dutch dialects in North Holland. The last native speaker, Petronella de Boer-Zeylemaker, died in 1993 at the age of 107.

== Geography ==
The majority of the landscape of the island consists of sand dunes, but there are some wooded areas and small meadows. A large part of the island, the western part, consists mainly of sand. There is one village on the island, Oost-Vlieland (West Frisian: East-Flylân). A second village, West-Vlieland, was lost to the sea in 1736.

=== Transport ===
Vlieland can be reached by ferry from the Frisian town of Harlingen on the mainland. Ferries are operated by Doeksen and the journey takes 45 minutes to 1.5 hours to cross the Wadden Sea and part of the North Sea. Tourists are not allowed to bring cars with them on the ferry. A summer-only ferry service runs between De Cocksdorp on the neighboring island of Texel and the westernmost point of Vlieland. The most common form of transport on the island is the bicycle; a network of cycle paths criss-cross the island. A bus service runs from the ferry terminal to the village and campsites after the arrival of a ferry, and some time before departure. There is a very small heliport near the village, but it is only used for SAR flights.

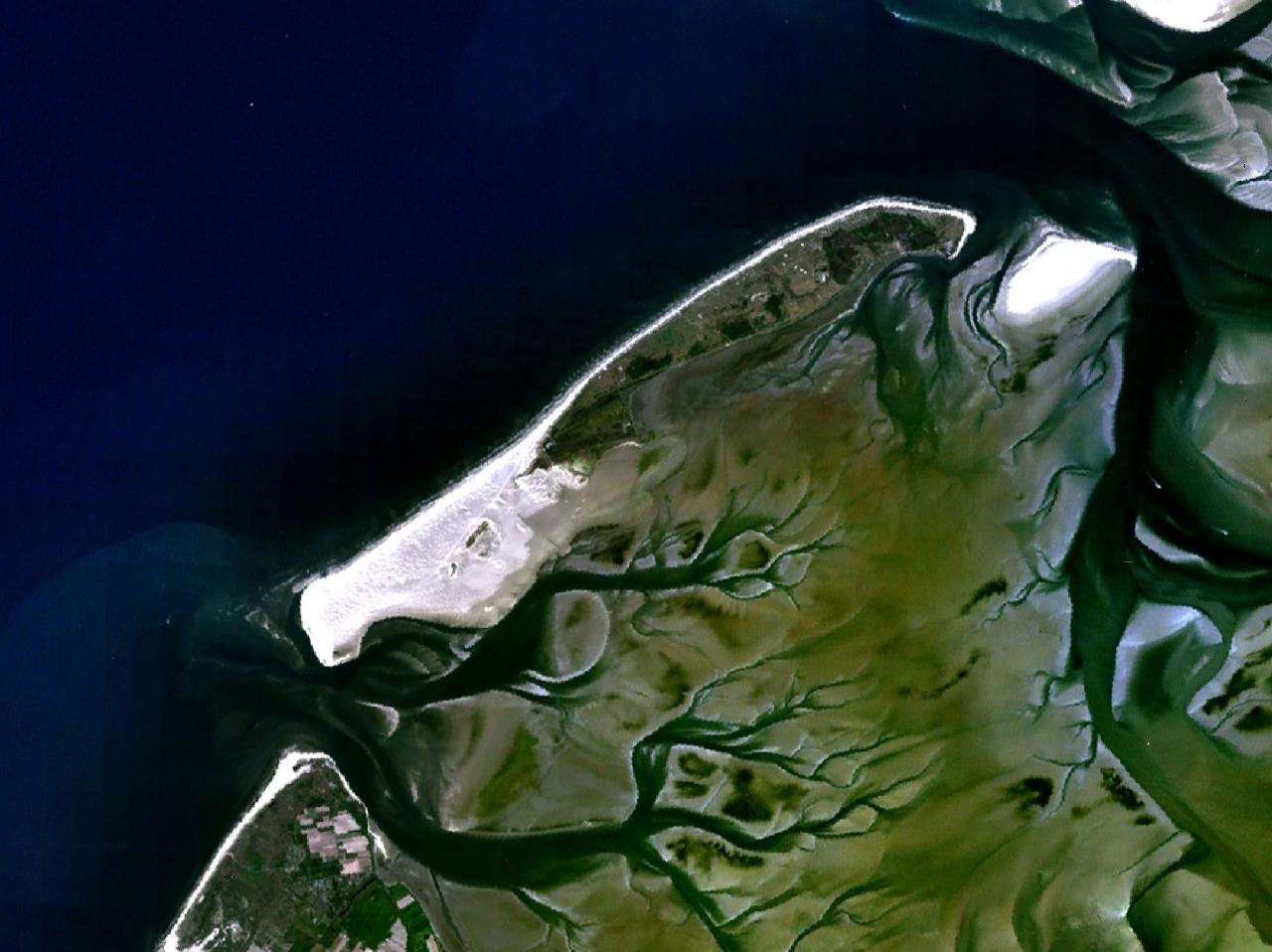
Vlieland. Satellite view

=== Climate ===
Vlieland, being the outermost of the Frisian barrier islands, sees its climate the most moderated by the North- and Wadden Sea. As is the case with the other West Frisian islands, sunshine hours are among the highest in the Netherlands. Temperature extremes are rare; on average only 6 times a year does the daytime high exceed 25 °C (77 °F), and a high above 30 °C (86 °F) happens on average only once every three years. This also counts for extreme cold; only on five days a year does the temperature stay below 0 °C (32 °F) for a whole 24-hour period, and nighttime frost happens on less than 40 nights a year. Nights below −10 °C (14 °F) only happen on average once every two years. Wind is abundant however, the average wind speed on Vlieland is almost 8 metres per second (26 ft/s). Gale-force winds occur on average nine days per year.

Climate data for Vlieland (10m amsl)
Month	Jan	Feb	Mar	Apr	May	Jun	Jul	Aug	Sep	Oct	Nov	Dec	Year
Mean daily maximum °C (°F)	5.5 (41.9)	5.3 (41.5)	7.4 (45.3)	11.1 (52.0)	14.7 (58.5)	17.2 (63.0)	19.8 (67.6)	20.4 (68.7)	17.7 (63.9)	14.1 (57.4)	10.0 (50.0)	6.7 (44.1)	12.3 (54.1)
Daily mean °C (°F)	3.7 (38.7)	3.5 (38.3)	5.2 (41.4)	8.1 (46.6)	11.5 (52.7)	14.3 (57.7)	16.8 (62.2)	17.5 (63.5)	15.1 (59.2)	11.5 (52.7)	7.7 (45.9)	4.8 (40.6)	10.2 (50.4)
Mean daily minimum °C (°F)	1.8 (35.2)	1.6 (34.9)	3.1 (37.6)	5.0 (41.0)	8.4 (47.1)	11.3 (52.3)	13.7 (56.7)	14.6 (58.3)	12.4 (54.3)	9.0 (48.2)	5.3 (41.5)	2.5 (36.5)	7.6 (45.7)
Average precipitation mm (inches)	72 (2.8)	49 (1.9)	55 (2.2)	32 (1.3)	45 (1.8)	50 (2.0)	68 (2.7)	72 (2.8)	89 (3.5)	105 (4.1)	98 (3.9)	82 (3.2)	919 (36.2)
Average precipitation days	12	10	11	7	8	9	10	11	13	14	16	15	135
Average relative humidity (%)	86	83	80	73	72	73	74	73	75	79	83	86	78
Mean monthly sunshine hours	68	99	142	204	247	228	239	213	156	118	70	61	1,835

== Politics ==
Vlieland has a nine-member municipal council elected every four years. The results of the 2026 election are shown in the table below.

Party	Popular vote		Seats
Party	Votes	%	Seats
Nieuw Liberaal Vlieland (NLV)	239	36.6	4 / 9
GroenWit (GW)	162	24.8	2 / 9
Lijst Fier	162	24.8	2 / 9
Algemeen Belang Vlieland (ABV)	90	13.8	1 / 9

Michiel Schrier (Socialist Party) has been mayor of Vlieland since 2021.

== Economy ==
Tourism is the main source of income on Vlieland. There are approximately 15 hotels, and several hundred apartments and holiday homes. Vlieland has two campsites.

Here Comes The Summer and Into The Great Wide Open are two music festivals, held respectively in late April and in late August.

== Notable people ==
- Willem de Vlamingh (1640 in Oost-Vlieland – 1698) a Dutch sea captain who explored the coast of Australia, then New Holland
- Nicolaas Kruik (1678 in West-Vlieland – 1754) a land surveyor, cartographer, astronomer and weatherman; remembered for the Museum De Cruquius
- Liesbeth List (1941 – 2020) a singer who as a child was adopted by the Vlieland lighthousekeeper and spent her teenage years on the island. A walkway to the lighthouse is named after her.

== Gallery ==
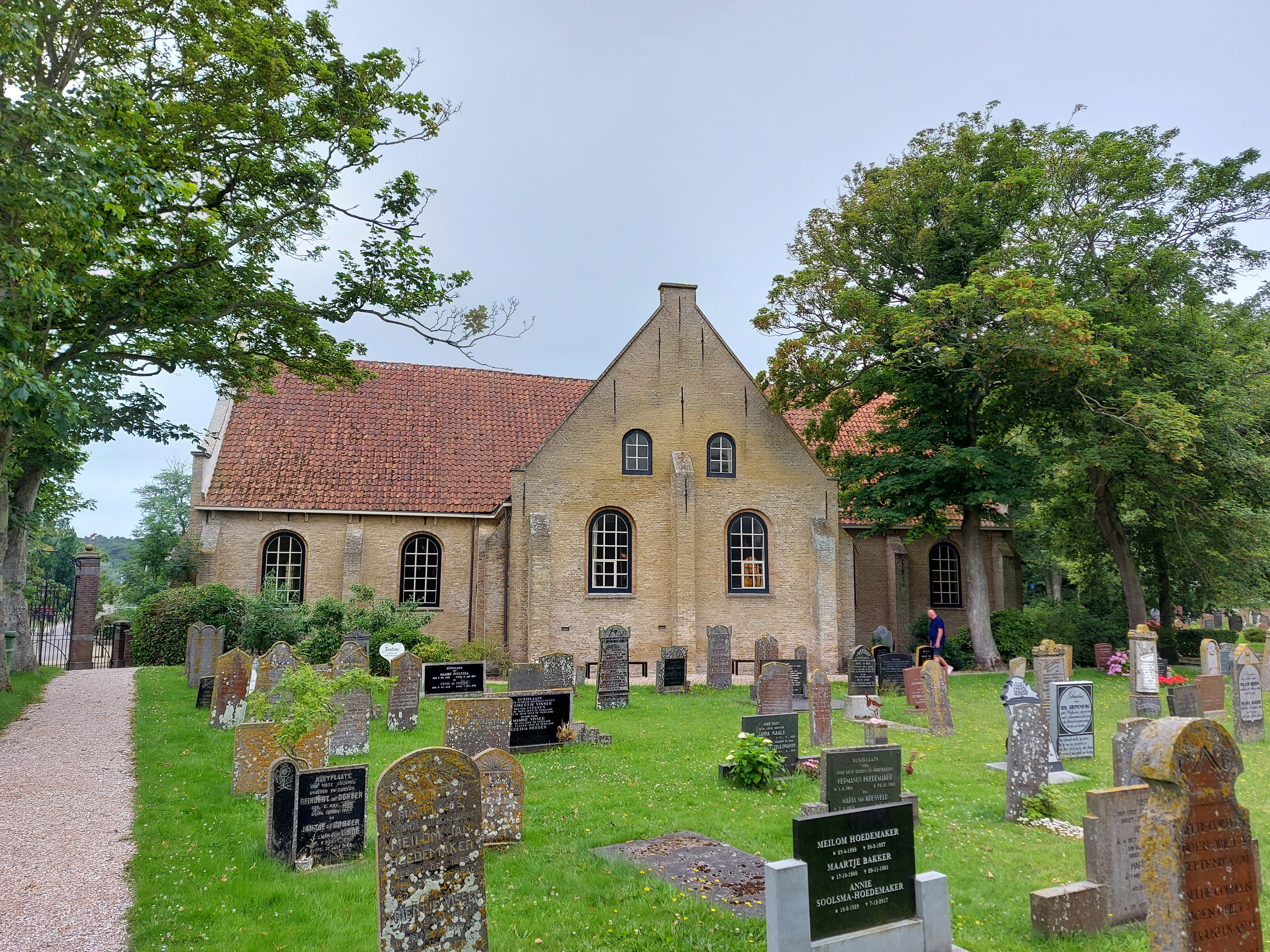
St. Nicolas church (Nicolaas Kerk) in Oost-Vlieland

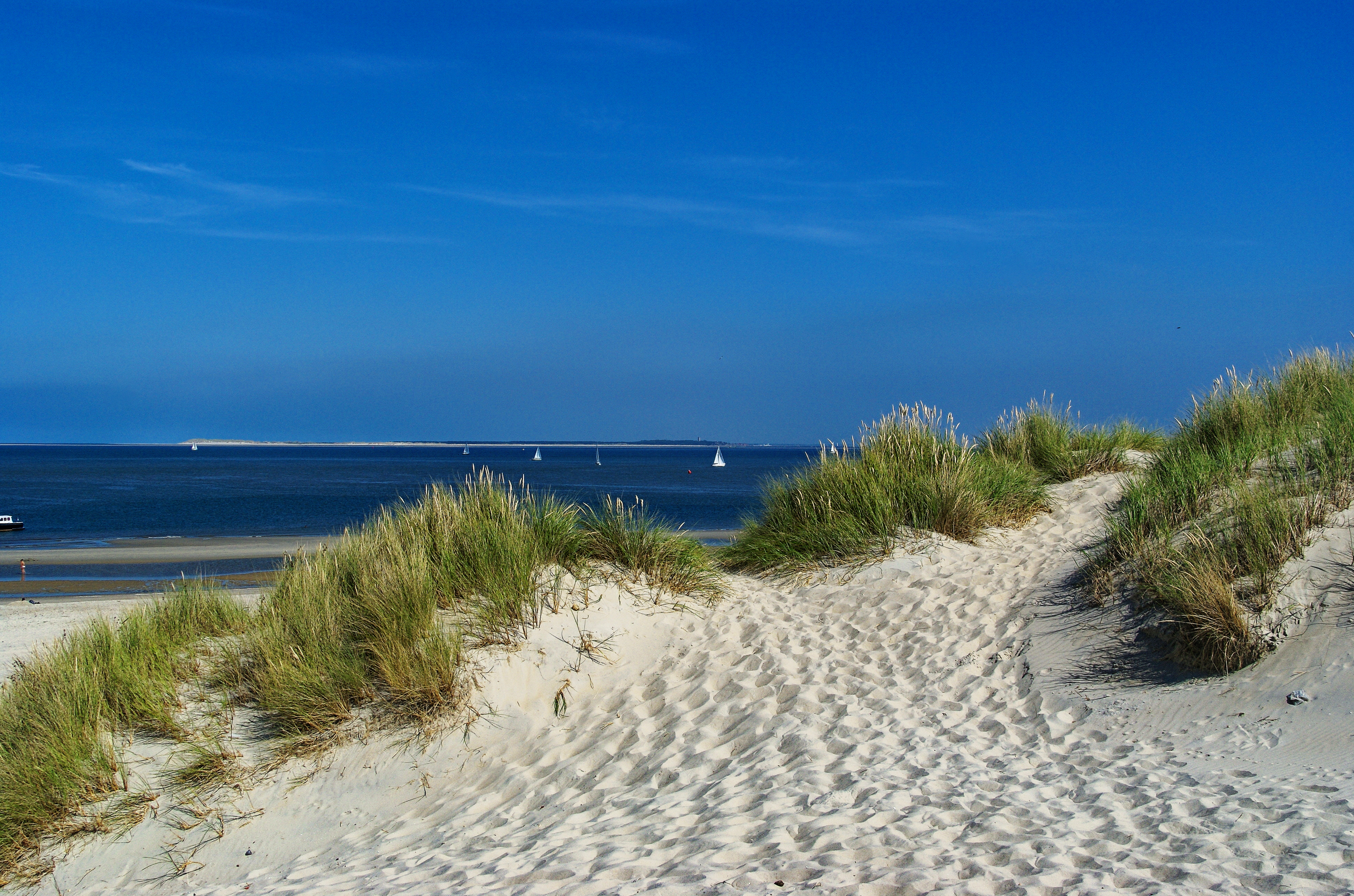
Dunes on the northern shore of Vlieland looking towards Terschelling

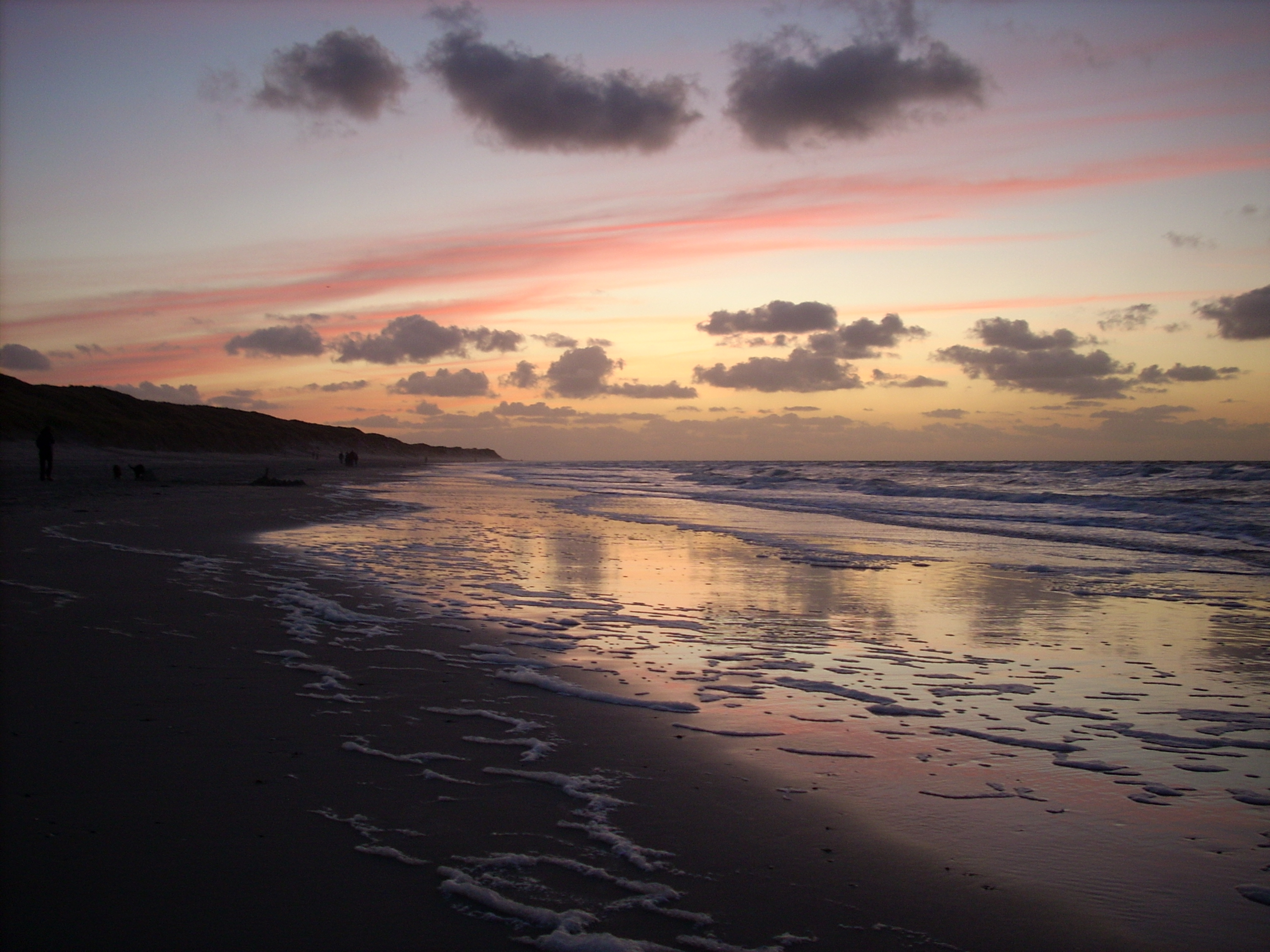
Vlieland, beach at dusk

Aerial view of Vlieland from the west
