= Cruquius, Netherlands =

Cruquius
- Village
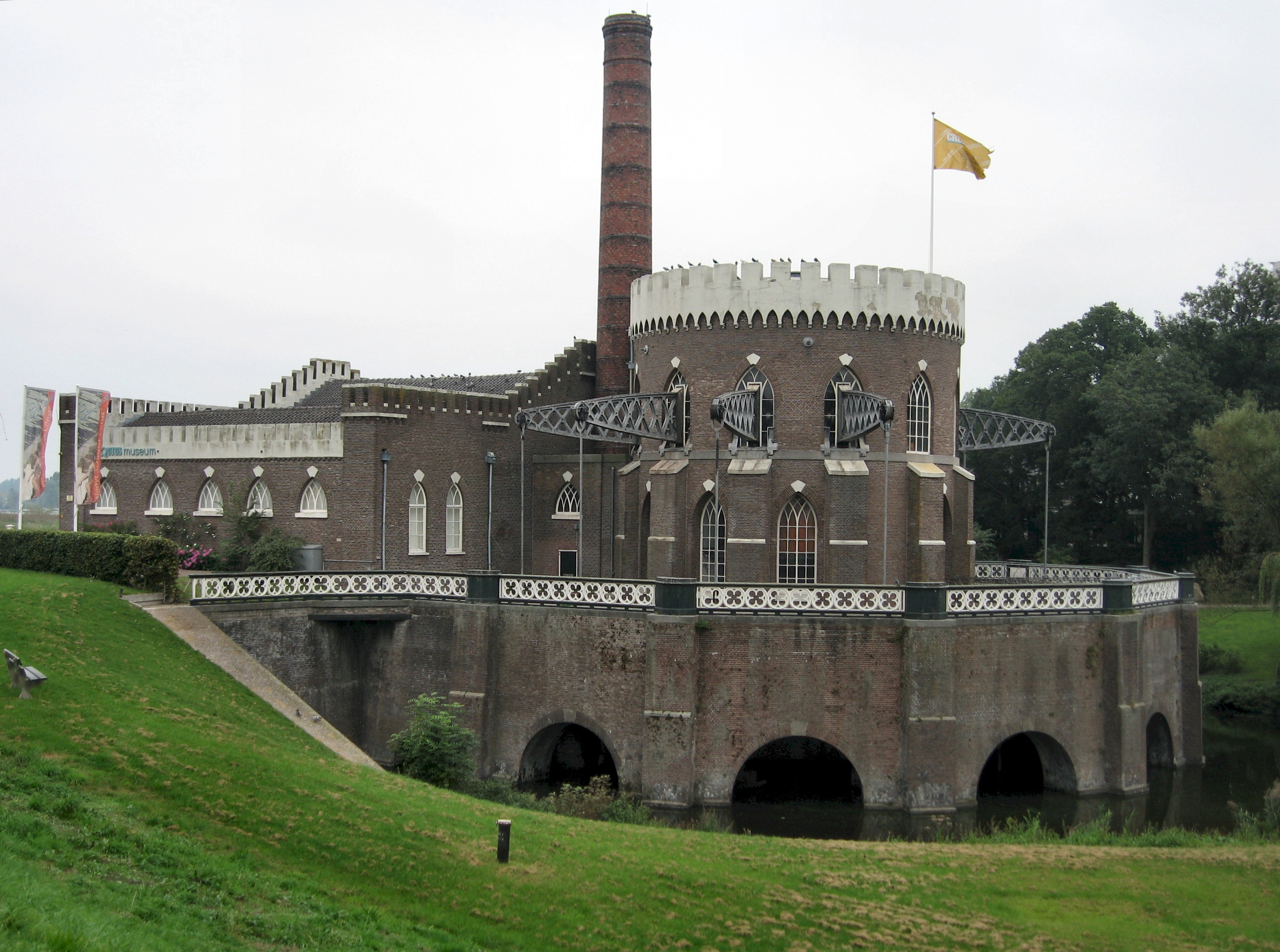
- Pumping station

- Location in the Netherlands Location in the province of North Holland in the Netherlands
- Coordinates: 52°20′N 4°38′E
- Country: Netherlands
- Province: North Holland
- Municipality: Haarlemmermeer

Area
  - Total: 3.64 km^{2} (1.41 sq mi)
- Elevation: −0.6 m (−2.0 ft)

Population (2021)
  - Total: 1,040
  - Density: 286/km^{2} (740/sq mi)
- Time zone: UTC+1 (CET)
  - Summer (DST): UTC+2 (CEST)
- Postal code: 2142
- Dialing code: 023

Cruquius (Dutch pronunciation: [ˈkrykijʏs]) is a village in the Dutch province of North Holland. It is a part of the municipality of Haarlemmermeer and lies about 4 km northwest of Hoofddorp.

== History ==
Cruquius gets its name from Nicolaas Kruik (1678–1754), a Dutch land-surveyor and one of many promoters of a plan to pump the Haarlemmermeer (Haarlem lake) dry. Like many well-educated men of his time, he Latinized his name to Nicolaas Samuel Cruquius. During his lifetime the issue of the Haarlem Lake and how to pump it dry was international news, as the following excerpt from the Virginia Gazette on May 31, 1751, illustrates:

"By a private letter from Rotterdam, we are told, that the Dutch Engineers, in their Plan for draining the lake of Haerlem, proposed to employ 150 mills for three Years, and had computed the Expense at a Million and Half of Florins, but that a German, who had been long employed in the Mines of Hungary and Hartz, had proposed to drain it with 50 machines, in 15 months, at a far less Expense; and that he has been ordered to erect one of those Machines, which, if it shall be found to execute what he has asserted, his Proposal will be immediately accepted."

Even 50 machines proved too expensive, so it wasn't until successful experiments with steam pumping stations, such as at nearby Groenendaal park in 1781, that serious plans resulted in three steam driven pumping stations, including the one at Cruquius. As a tribute to former planners, the pumping stations of the Haarlemmermeer were named after them. The one at the mouth of the Spaarne river, near Heemstede, was called Cruquius. To service the mill, the workers who lived there founded the village of the same name. The dike was built in the 1840s, the pump started work in 1850 and in the three years that had been predicted a century before, the Haarlem lake was pumped dry. The pumping station Cruquius continued to work on and off until 1933, when it was made into a museum. The foreman's house was made into a café which it still is today.

== Gallery ==
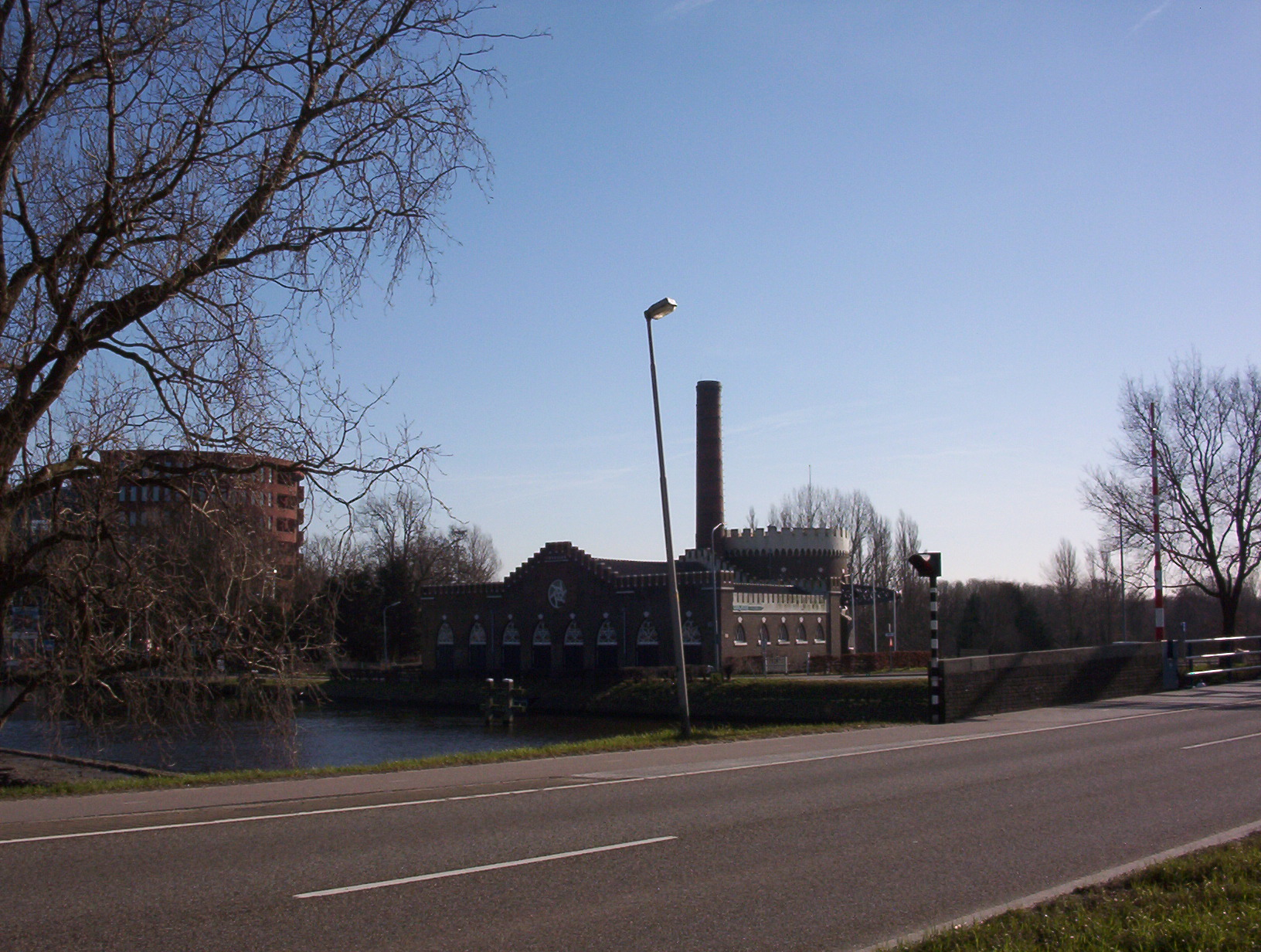
Cruquius Museum, seen from Heemstede side of Cruquius bridge over the Ringvaart

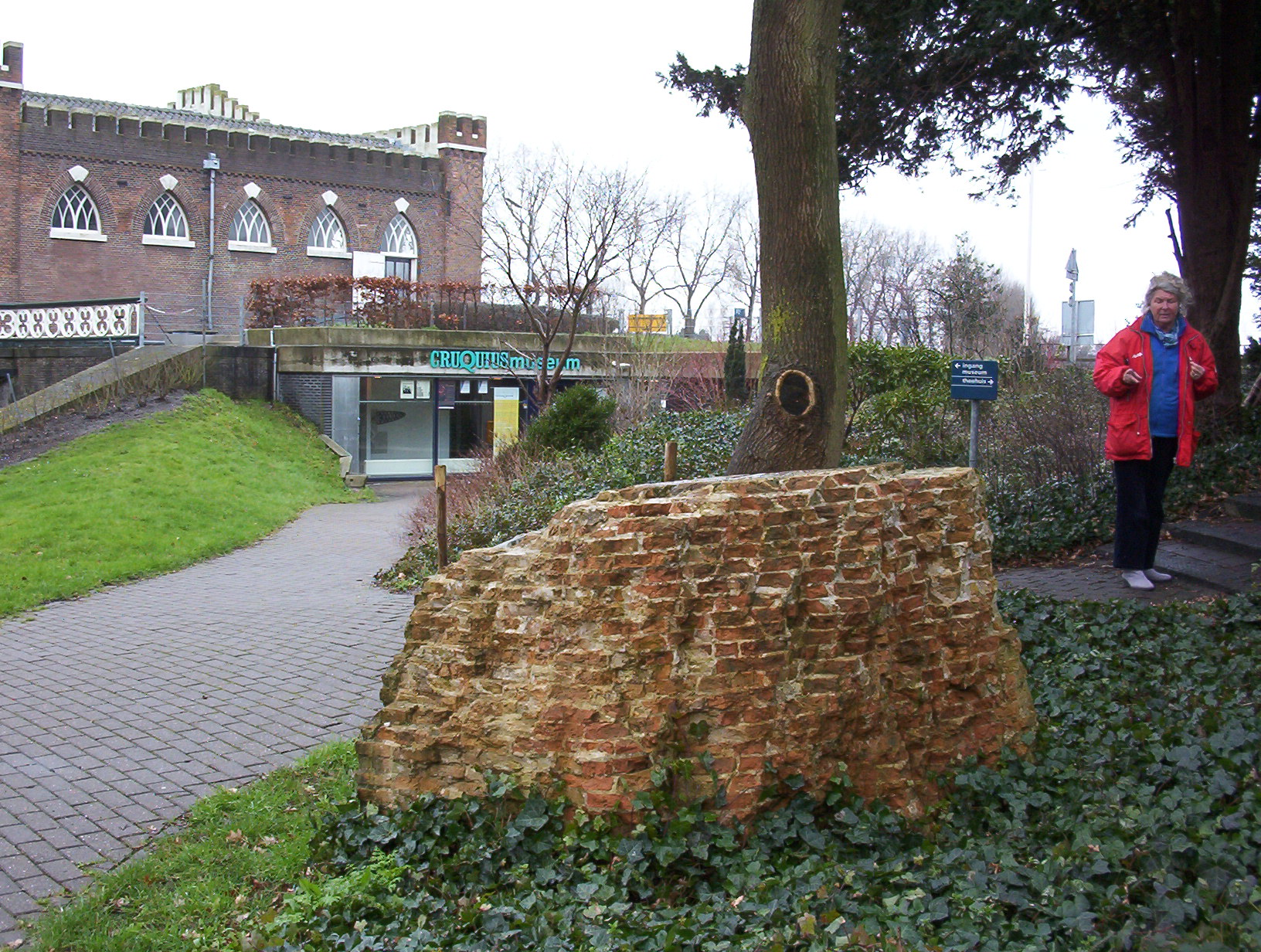
Cruquius Museum entrance, showing piece of foundation from first steam mill in the Netherlands

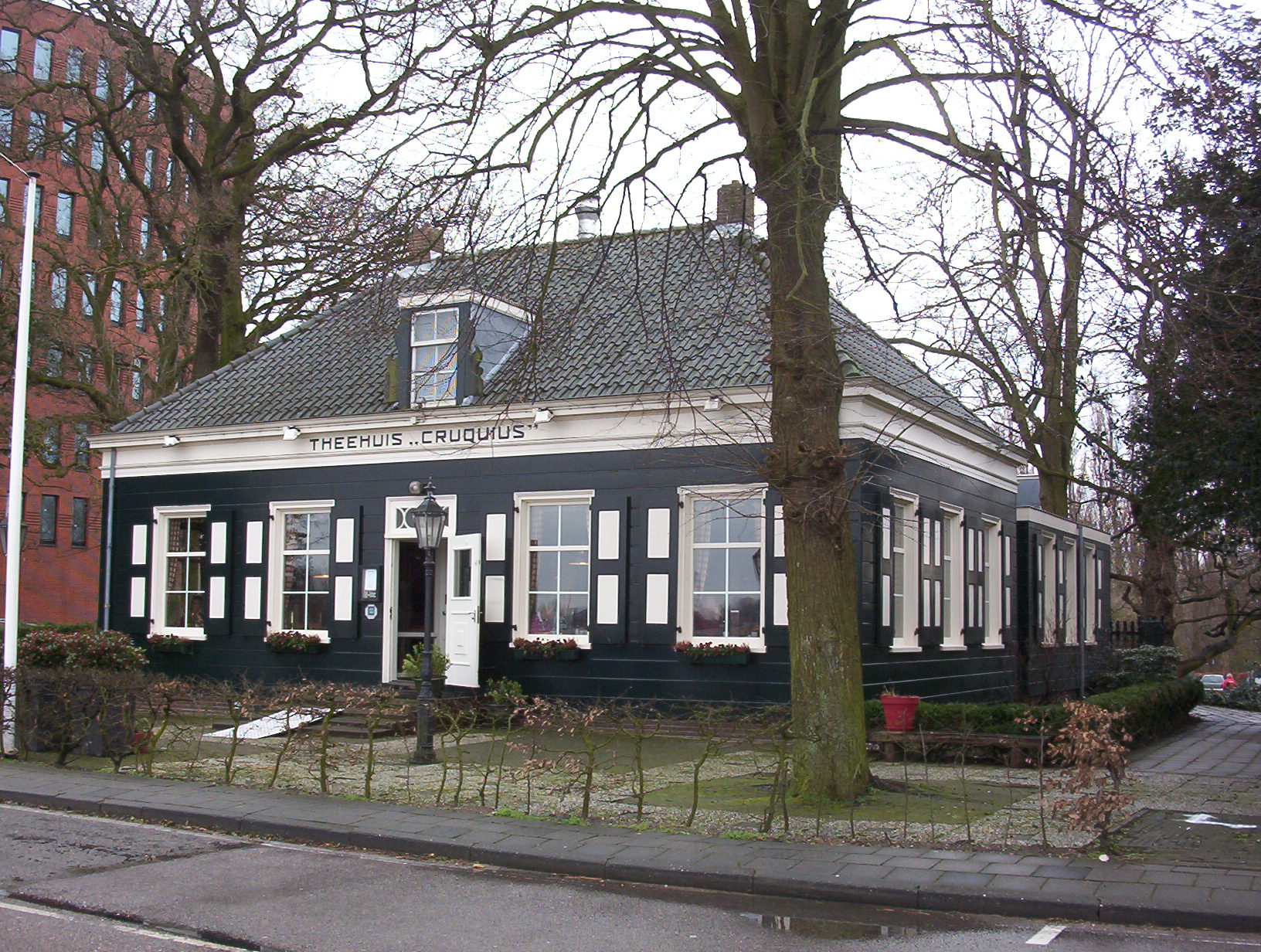
Former residence of Cruquius mill's foreman, today a café next to the museum.

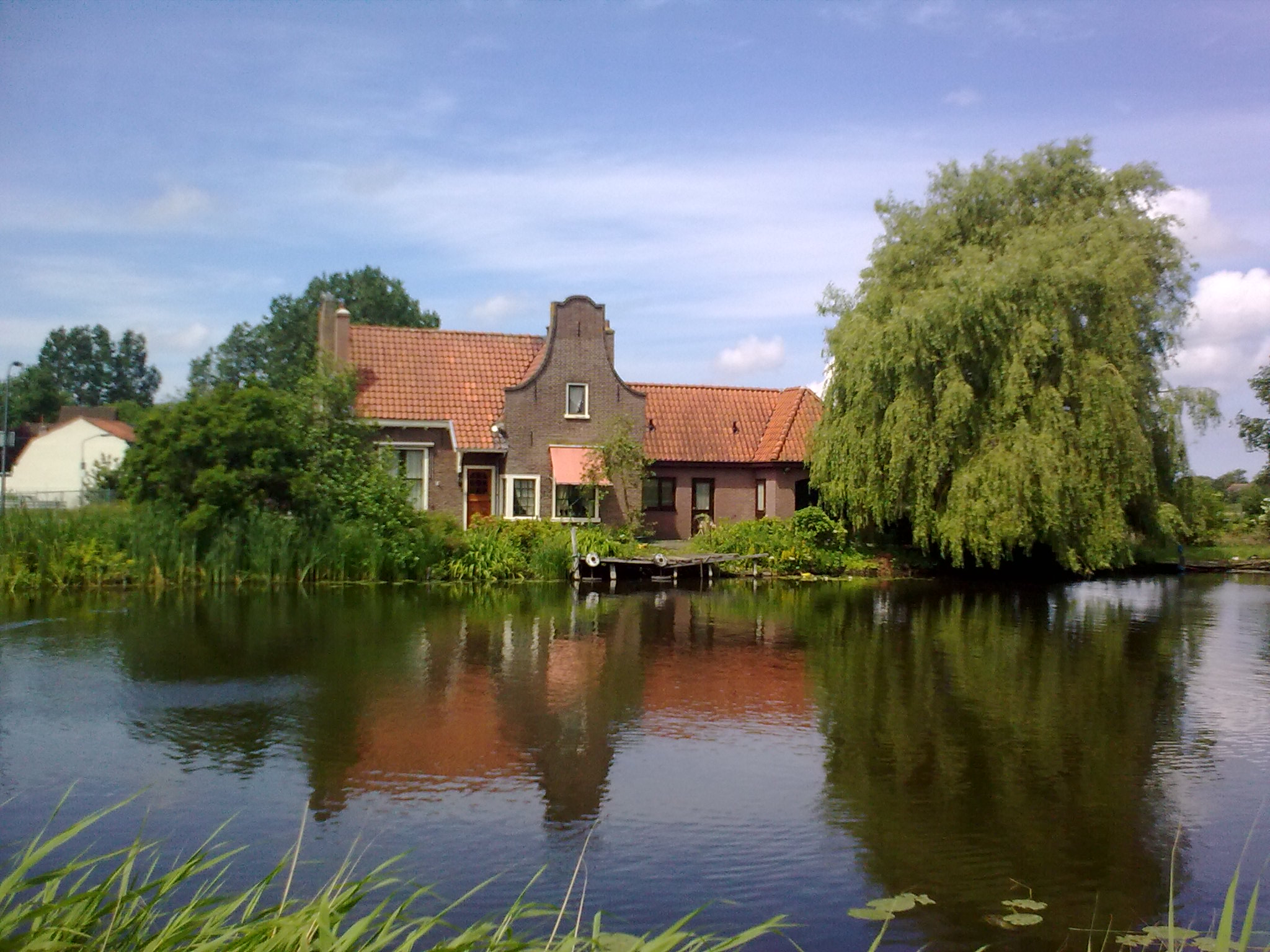
House in Cruquius

== See also ==
- Museum De Cruquius
