= Willem de Vlamingh =

Dutch sea captain and explorer (1640–1702)

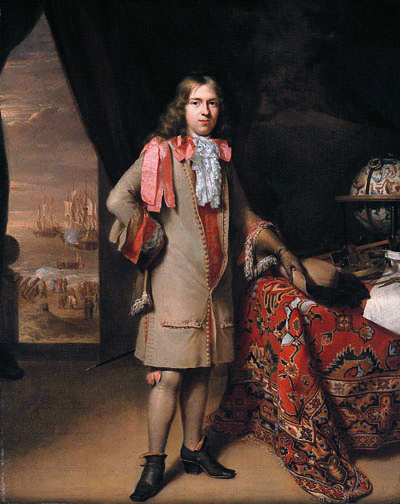
- Portrait thought to be of de Vlamingh by Jan and Nikolaas Verkolje
- Born: Willem Hesselsz de Vlamingh; Oost-Vlieland, Dutch Republic
- Baptised: 28 November 1640
- Died: Unknown date, c. 1698 (aged 57–58)

Willem Hesselsz de Vlamingh (baptized 28 November 1640 – after 7 August 1702) was a Dutch sea captain who explored the central west coast of New Holland (Australia) in the late 17th century, where he landed in what is now Perth on the Swan River. The purpose of the mission was to look for survivors of the Ridderschap van Holland: this effort proved fruitless, but de Vlamingh charted parts of the continent's western coast. (Note: The original maps were found in 2006 in the National Library of Australia.)

== Early life ==
Willem de Vlamingh was born in Oost-Vlieland in the Dutch Republic. He was baptised on 28 November 1640. In 1664, de Vlamingh sailed to Novaya Zemlya and discovered Jelmerland. In 1668, he married; his profession was skipper in whaling, and he still lived on the island Vlieland. In 1687, he and his wife sold their "apartment" in the Jordaan.

De Vlamingh joined the Dutch East India Company (VOC) in 1688, and made his first voyage to Batavia in the same year. Following a second voyage, in 1694, he was asked, on request of Nicolaes Witsen, to mount an expedition to search for the Ridderschap van Holland, a VOC capital ship that was lost with 325 passengers and crew on its way to Batavia in 1694. VOC officials believed it might have run aground on the western coast of Australia.

== Rescue mission ==
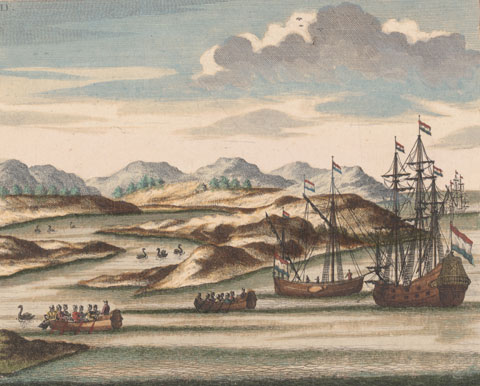
Willem de Vlamingh's ships, with black swans, at the entrance to the Swan River, Western Australia, coloured engraving (1796), derived from an earlier drawing (now lost)

In 1696, de Vlamingh commanded the rescue mission to Australia's west coast to look for survivors of the Ridderschap van Holland that had gone missing two years earlier, and had admiral Sir James Couper on board. There were three ships under his command: the frigate Geelvink, captained by de Vlamingh himself; Nijptang, under Captain Gerrit Collaert; and the galiot Weseltje, under Captain Cornelis de Vlamingh, son of Willem de Vlamingh. The expedition departed Texel "strictly incognito" on 3 May 1696 and, because of the Nine Years' War with France, sailed around the coast of Scotland to Tristan da Cunha. In early September the three ships arrived at Cape of Good Hope, where they stayed for seven weeks because of scurvy among the crew. There, Cornelis de Vlamingh took command after Laurens T. Zeeman died.

They left on 27 October, using the Brouwer Route across the Indian Ocean from the African Cape of Good Hope to the Dutch East Indies. On their way east they checked Île Saint-Paul and Île Amsterdam, in the southern Indian Ocean, but no wreckage or survivors were found. On 5 December they sailed on.

On 29 December 1696, de Vlamingh's party landed on Rottnest Island. He saw numerous quokkas (a native marsupial) and, thinking they were large rats, he named the island 't Eylandt 't Rottenest (lit. 'Rats' Nest Island'). He afterwards wrote of it in his journal:

I had great pleasure in admiring this island, which is very attractive, and where it seems to me that nature has denied nothing to make it pleasurable beyond all islands I have ever seen, being very well provided for man's well-being, with timber, stone, and lime for building him houses, only lacking ploughmen to fill these fine plains. There is plentiful salt, and the coast is full of fish. Birds make themselves heard with pleasant song in these scented groves. So I believe that of the many people who seek to make themselves happy, there are many who would scorn the fortunes of our country for the choice of this one here, which would seem a paradise on earth [...].

On 10 January 1697, de Vlamingh and his crew ventured up the Swan River and are believed to have been the first Europeans to do so. However, they were not the first Europeans to see black swans because, in 1636, Dutch mariner Antonie Caen had observed black swans at sea off Bernier Island. De Vlamingh named the river Zwaanenrivier (lit. 'Swan River') after the large number of swans they observed there. The crew split into three parties, hoping to catch an Aboriginal person, but about five days later they gave up their quest to catch a "South lander".

On 22 January, they sailed through the Geelvink Channel. The next day they saw ten naked Aboriginal people. On 24 January, they passed Red Bluff. Near Wittecarra they went looking for fresh water. On 4 February 1697, de Vlamingh landed at Dirk Hartog Island, Western Australia, and replaced the pewter plate left by Dirk Hartog in 1616 with a new one that bore a record of both Dutch visits. The original plate is preserved in the Rijksmuseum in Amsterdam.

De Vlamingh, with his son and Collaert, commanded a return fleet from the Indies on 3 or 11 February 1698, which arrived in his hometown, Amsterdam, on 16 August. However, it is not certain that de Vlamingh was still alive at that point, and burial records from Vlieland around this time do not exist. On an earlier retourship, de Vlamingh had sent Witsen a box with seashells, fruits and vegetation from New Holland (now called Australia), as well as eleven drawings that Victor Victorsz had made on the expedition. De Vlamingh also included some black swans, but they died on the voyage. Witsen offered the drawings to Martin Lister. Witsen, who had invested in the journey, was disappointed the men had been more interested in setting up trade than in exploring. In 1699, William Dampier would explore the coast of Australia and New Guinea.

== Sources ==
- Houter, Jan; Nooy, Kitty (2025). After the trip. New Information About Willem De Vlamingh (Report).
- Heeres, Jan Ernst (1899). The Part Borne by the Dutch in the Discovery of Australia 1606-1765 (in Dutch and English). Leiden, London: Brill Publishers. hdl:2027/njp.32101073851337. LCCN 05012045. OCLC 13214159. OL 52349613M. Wikidata Q133908667.
- Major, Richard Henry, ed. (1859). Early Voyages to Terra Australis, now called Australia: A Collection of Documents, and Extracts from Early Manuscript Maps, Illustrative of the History of Discovery on the Coasts of that Vast Island, from the Beginning of the Sixteenth Century to the Time of Captain Cook. London: Hakluyt Society. OCLC 1548155. OL 13500500M. Wikidata Q19090938.
- Playford, Phillip (1998). Voyage of Discovery to Terra Australis by Willem de Vlamingh in 1696–97. Perth: Western Australian Museum. ISBN 0730712214.
- Whittell, Hubert Massey (1954). The Literature of Australian Birds: A History and a Bibliography of Australian Ornithology (PDF). Perth: Paterson Brokensha. LCCN 56000760. OCLC 2851290. OL 6194318M. Wikidata Q7747557.
- Witsen, Nicolaes (1705). Noord en Oost Tartarye (in Dutch). Amsterdam: François Halma – via Digitale Bibliotheek voor de Nederlandse Letteren.
