= Vlieland Heliport =

- IATA: none; ICAO: EHVL

Summary
- Airport type: Military
- Operator: Royal Netherlands Air and Space Force
- Location: Vlieland
- Elevation AMSL: 37 ft (11 m)
- Coordinates: 53°17′48.72″N 005°05′08.25″E
- Interactive map of Vlieland Heliport

Vlieland heliport (Dutch: Helihaven Vlieland) is a small heliport used mainly by the Royal Netherlands Air and Space Force for search and rescue flights or medical transports from the island of Vlieland. It was home to one Agusta-Bell 412SP rescue helicopter, which was usually stationed on the island during the day and at Leeuwarden Air Base at night until it was retired in 2016. While the heliport remains under military control, medevac operations are now carried out primarily using an Airbus Helicopters H145 operated by ANWB. The heliport has one landing pad and a single hangar.

By law, use of the heliport is restricted to military, police and medevac helicopters and the number of movements is limited to 1500 a year.
