= Ridderschap van Holland (1682) =

Disappeared Dutch trading ship

History

Dutch Republic
- Name: Ridderschap van Holland
- Launched: 1682
- Fate: Disappeared 1694

General characteristics
- Displacement: 520 tons
- Length: 164 ft (50 m)
- Beam: 39.5 ft (12.0 m)
- Sail plan: Full-rigged ship

Ridderschap van Holland (Dutch pronunciation: [ˈrɪdərsxɑp fɑn ˈɦɔlɑnt]; lit. 'Knighthood of Holland') was a large retourschip (lit. 'return ship'), the largest class of merchantmen built by the Dutch East India Company (Dutch: Vereenigde Oostindische Compagnie, commonly abbreviated to VOC) to trade with the East Indies. In 1694 the ship sailed for Batavia (now Jakarta, Indonesia) on her fifth voyage, but was never heard from again. She is now thought to have been shipwrecked off the west coast of Australia.

== Construction details ==
She was built in Amsterdam, Dutch Republic in 1682 by the VOC, and registered at Vlissingen. She was 50 metres (164 ft) long and 12 metres (39.5 ft) wide, with a gross tonnage of about 520 tons.

== Early voyages ==
Ridderschap van Holland completed four voyages before her final voyage.

1. She departed Texel on 9 May 1683 under the command of Jakob Pietersz. Kool. She stayed at the Cape of Good Hope from 14 September to 13 October, and arrived at Batavia on 27 November. On 8 February 1684 she left Batavia for Wielingen, staying at the Cape of Good Hope from 21 May to 20 June, and arriving at Wielingen on 13 October.
2. On 21 December 1684 she departed Wielingen under the command of Jan Gagenaar. After stopping at the Cape from 7 April to 10 May 1685, she arrived in Batavia on 17 July. On 4 December she began her return voyage to Texel under the command of D Hendrick Pronk. She stayed at the Cape of Good Hope from 9 March to 12 April 1686, and arrived at Texel on 20 July.
3. She began her third voyage on 3 January 1686, departed Texel for Batavia. She stopped at the Cape from 20 April to 3 May, and arrived at Batavia on 26 July. On 18 January 1688, she departed Ceylon en route to Amsterdam, under Pronk's command. She stopped at the cape from 10 April to 30 April, arriving at Amsterdam later that year.
4. She departed Texel on 26 September 1689, bound for Batavia under captain Alexander Simons. She arrived at the Cape of Good Hope on 4 January 1690, departed the Cape on 6 February, and arrived at Batavia on 8 April. On 30 January 1692 she began her return voyage to Vlissingen, under the command of Jan Ammansz. It stopped at the Cape of Good Hope from 27 May to 26 June, and arrived at her destination on 14 October.

== Final voyage ==
On 11 July 1693, Ridderschap van Holland departed Wielingen on a voyage to Batavia under Captain Dirk de Lange. She arrived at the Cape of Good Hope on 9 January 1694, remaining there until 5 February. She sailed from the Cape with a crew of around 300, and two passengers, including Admiral Sir James Couper. She never reached her destination, and was never heard from again. Contemporary rumours suggested that she had sprung her mast rounding the Cape, limped north, and was captured by pirates based at Fort Dauphin, near the southeastern corner of Madagascar. However, Abraham Samuel, the pirate supposedly responsible, did not arrive in the area until 1697.

In 1697, Willem de Vlamingh was sent with three ships to search for Ridderschap van Holland at Île Saint-Paul and Île Amsterdam, and then along the west coast of Australia. Nothing was found. Two years later, two ships made investigations while visiting Madagascar, but without success.

It is probable that Ridderschap van Holland was actually wrecked in the Pelsaert Group of the Houtman Abrolhos islands off the coast of Western Australia. The crew of a later East Indiaman, Zeewijk, which was wrecked on Pelsaert Island in 1727, discovered the remains of a Dutch ship of approximately the right period on their island, together with numerous artifacts, such as bottles, that suggested some of a ship's crew had survived in the islands for a considerable time. John Lort Stokes, captain of HMS Beagle, also saw these artifacts in 1840. It is now widely thought that these artifacts were from Ridderschap van Holland, although it is possible that they came from Fortuyn, which disappeared in 1724 but is now thought to have been wrecked near Cocos Islands.

Any archaeological remains were destroyed by guano mining on the island in the early 20th century, so positive identification of the wreck is now impossible.

== See also ==
- List of people who disappeared mysteriously at sea

== General references ==
- "Ridderschap van Holland". Western Australian Shipwrecks Database. Department of Maritime Archaeology, Western Australian Museum.
- Ridderschap van Holland in the National Shipwreck Database
- "Ridderschap van Holland". VOC Shipwrecks. Archived from the original on 24 June 2007.
- Heeres, Jan Ernst (3 January 2006) [1899]. Choat, Colin (ed.). The Part Borne by the Dutch in the Discovery of Australia 1606-1765. Project Gutenberg Australia. Wikidata Q132175190.
- Halls, C. (1965). "The Loss of the Ridderschap van Holland". The Annual Dog Watch. 22: 36–43.
- Rogozinski, Jan (2000). Honour Among Thieves: Captain Kidd, Henry Every and the Story of Pirate Island. London: Conway Maritime Press.
- Dash, Mike (2003). Batavia's Graveyard. New York: Three Rivers Press. ISBN 0609807161. OCLC 1301805234. OL 7586356M.
