= Oost-Vlieland =

Oost-Vlieland East-Flylân
- Village
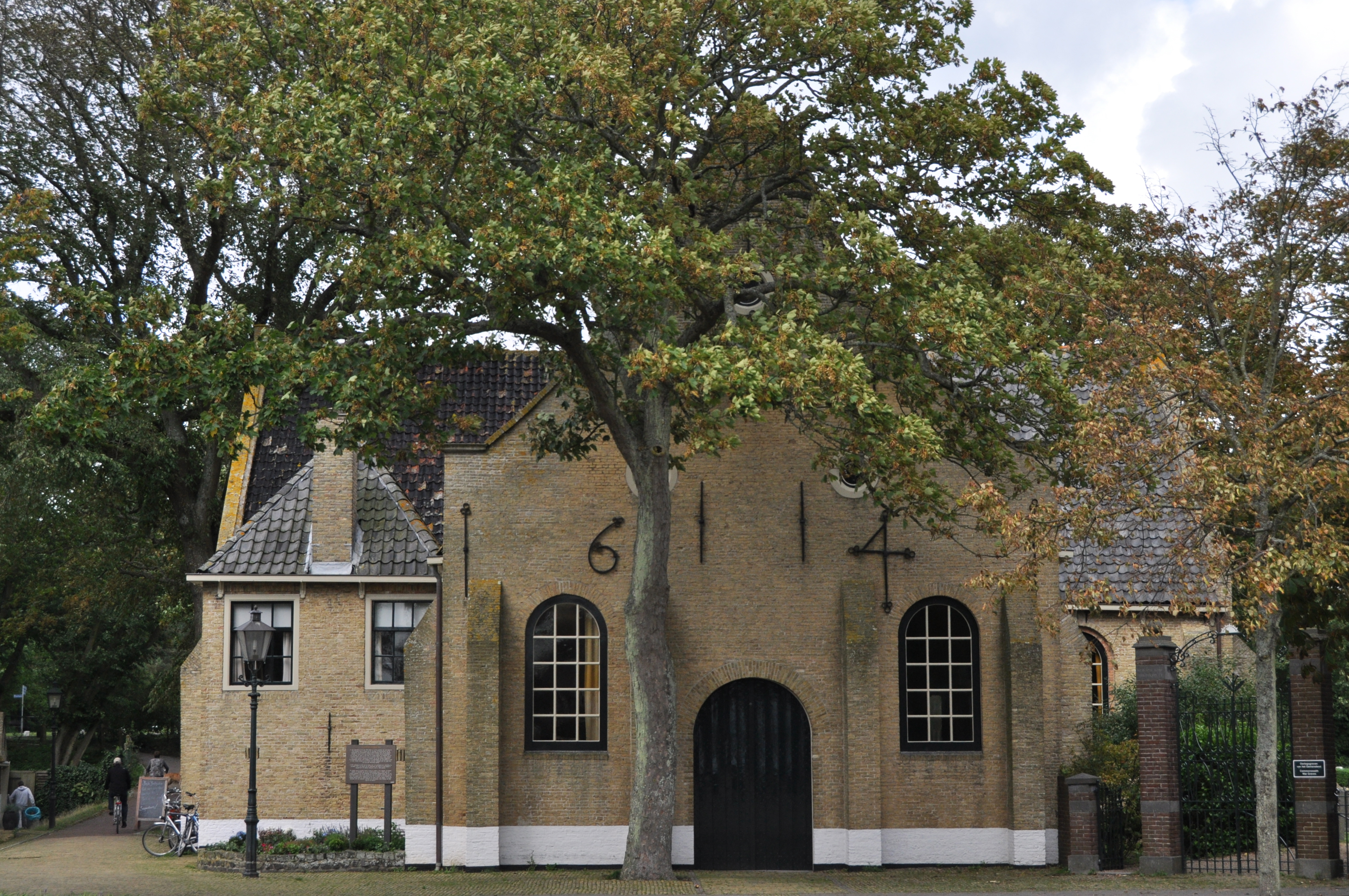
- St Nicholas' Church

- Location of the village on Vlieland island

- Location in the Netherlands
- Country: Netherlands
- Province: Friesland
- Municipality: Vlieland

Population (1 January 2017)
  - Total: 1,020
- Time zone: UTC+1 (CET)
  - Summer (DST): UTC+2 (CEST)
- Postal code: 8899
- Dialing code: 0562

Oost-Vlieland (West Frisian: East-Flylân) is the only village on the island of Vlieland in the province Friesland of the Netherlands. It had a population of around 1,020 in January 2017. It is situated on the east end of the island as its name indicates: Oost is "east" in Dutch.

== History ==
Oost-Vlieland is first mentioned in the sources in 1245. First inhabited mainly by poor farmers and fishermen, the settlement became wealthier in the 17th century when the Vlie estuary was used as moorage by the expanding Dutch trade fleets. There used to be a second village on Vlieland, West-Vlieland, but this was destroyed by a flood in 1736.

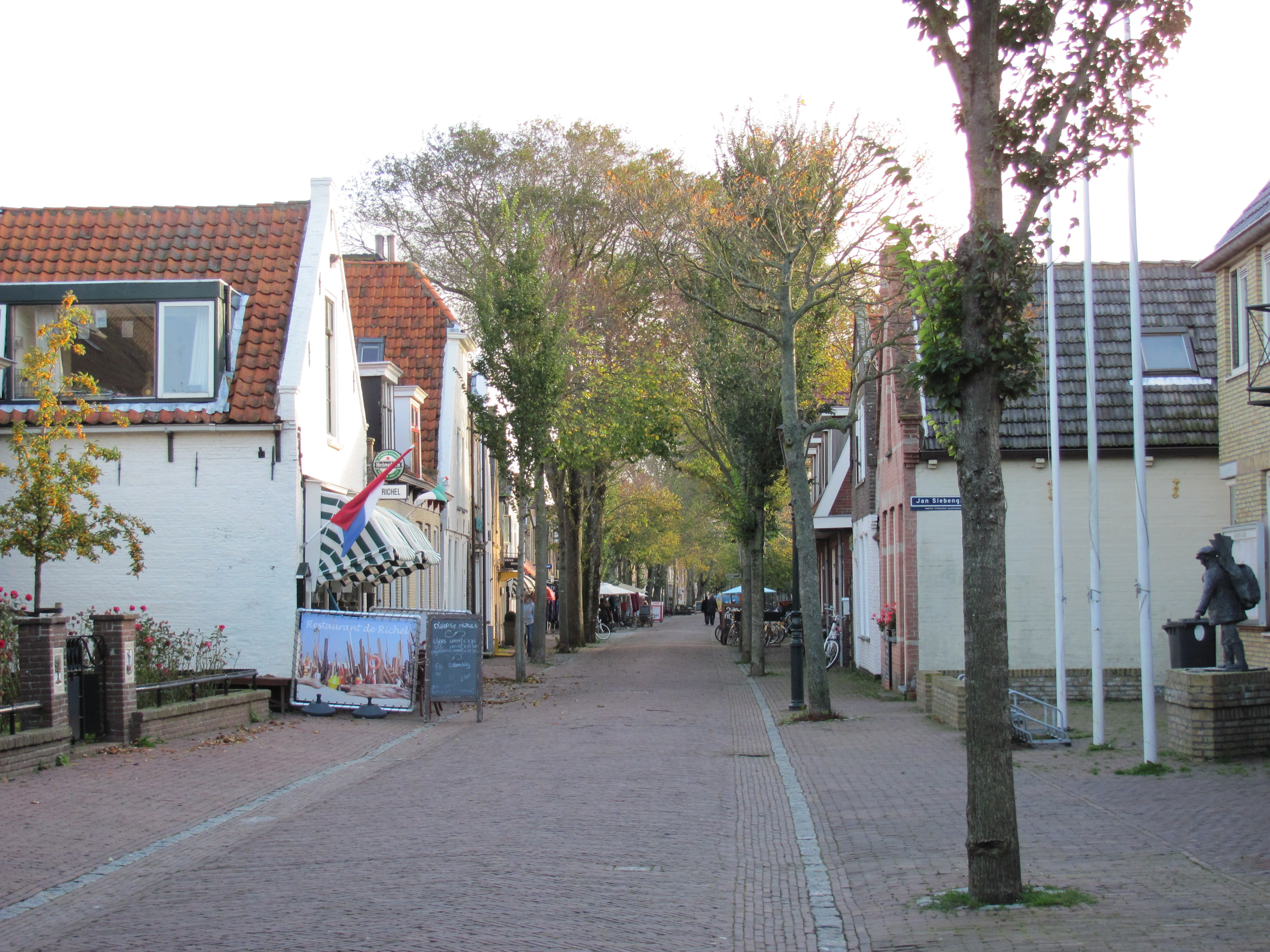
A view along the Dorpsstraat

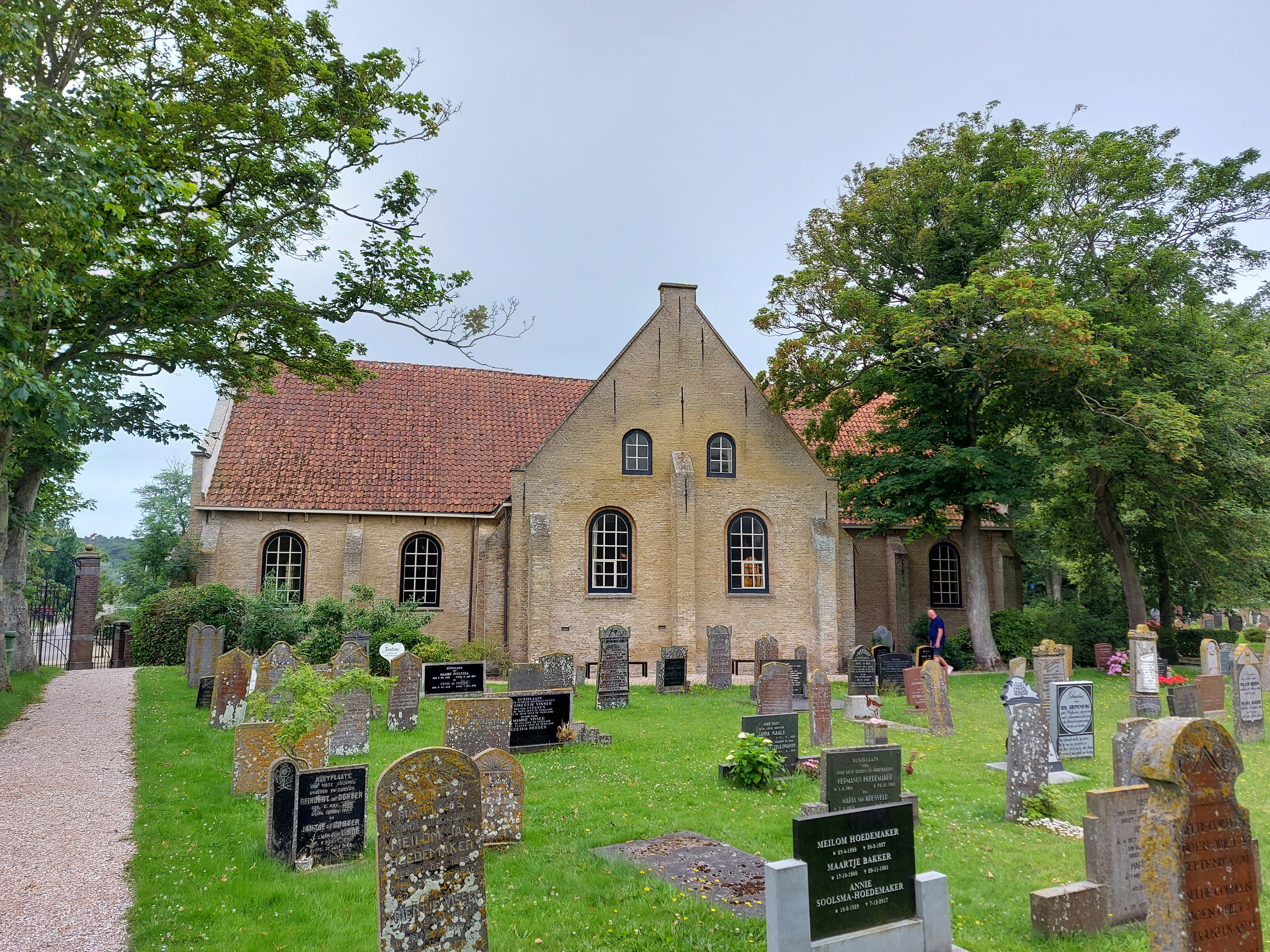
St. Nicolas church (Nicolaas Kerk)

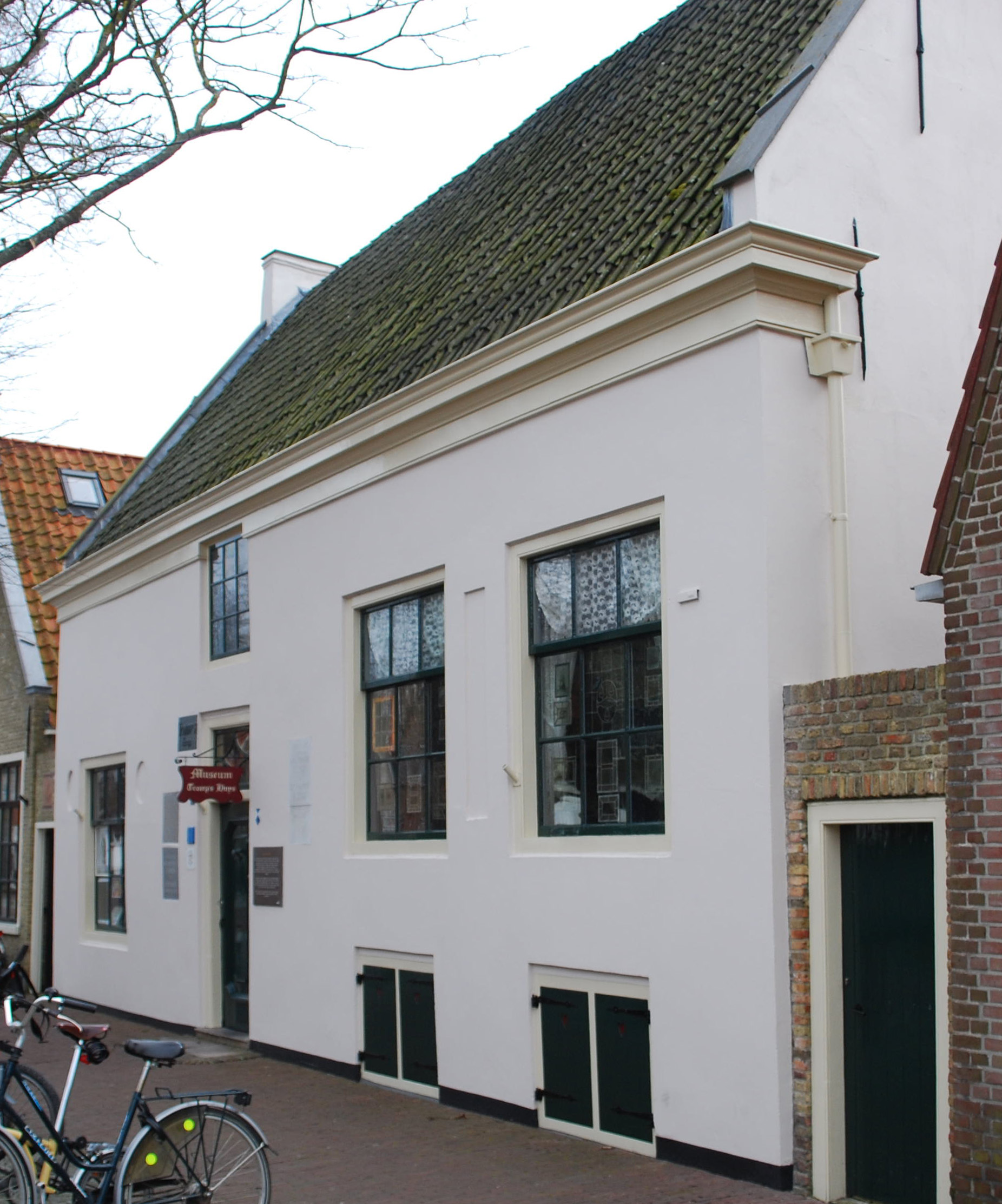
The Museum Tromp's Huys

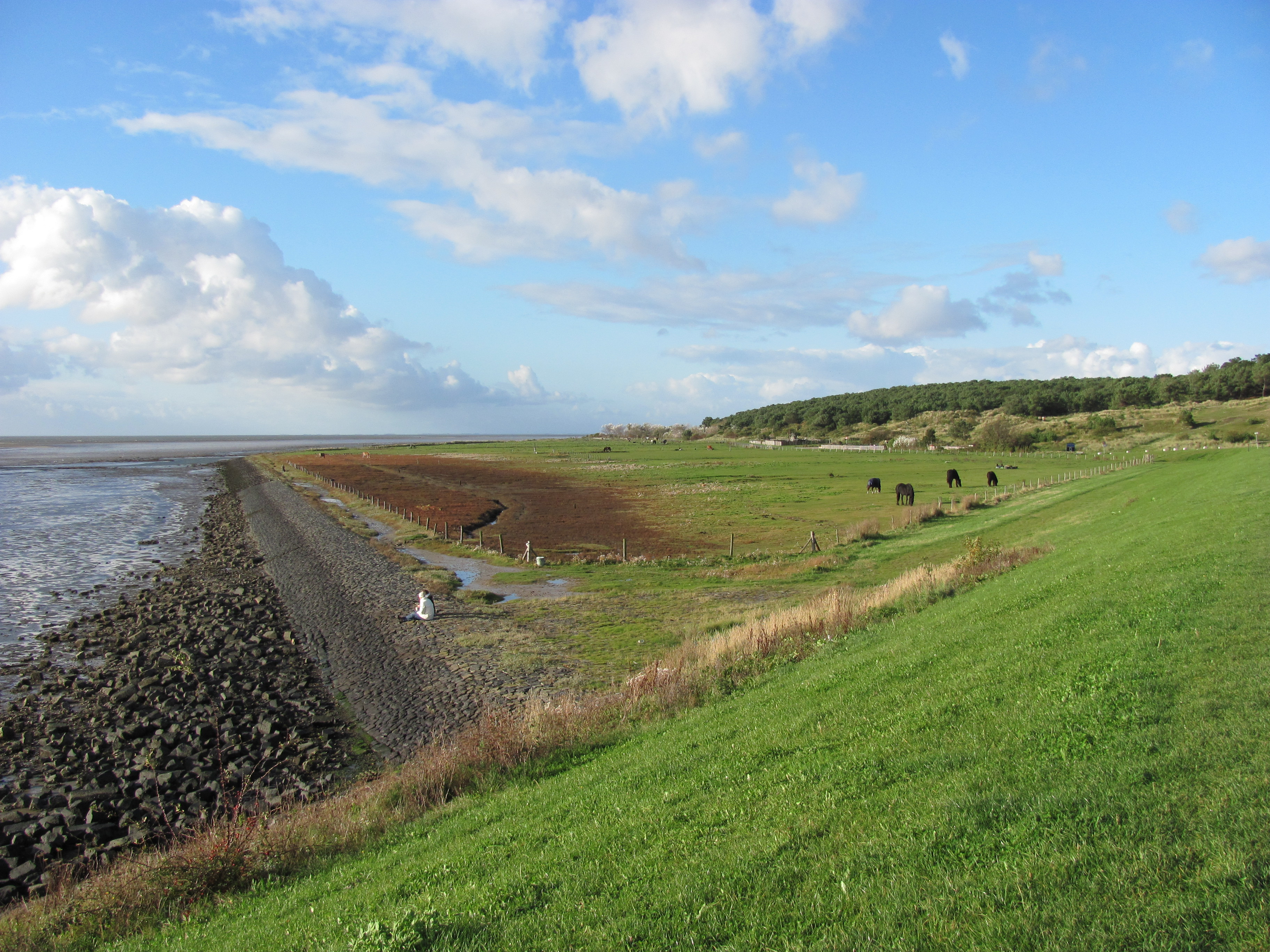
Horse paddocks outside of Oost-Vlieland
