= Museum De Cruquius =

Museum in Cruquius, the Netherlands

Coordinates: 52°20′17″N 4°38′18″E

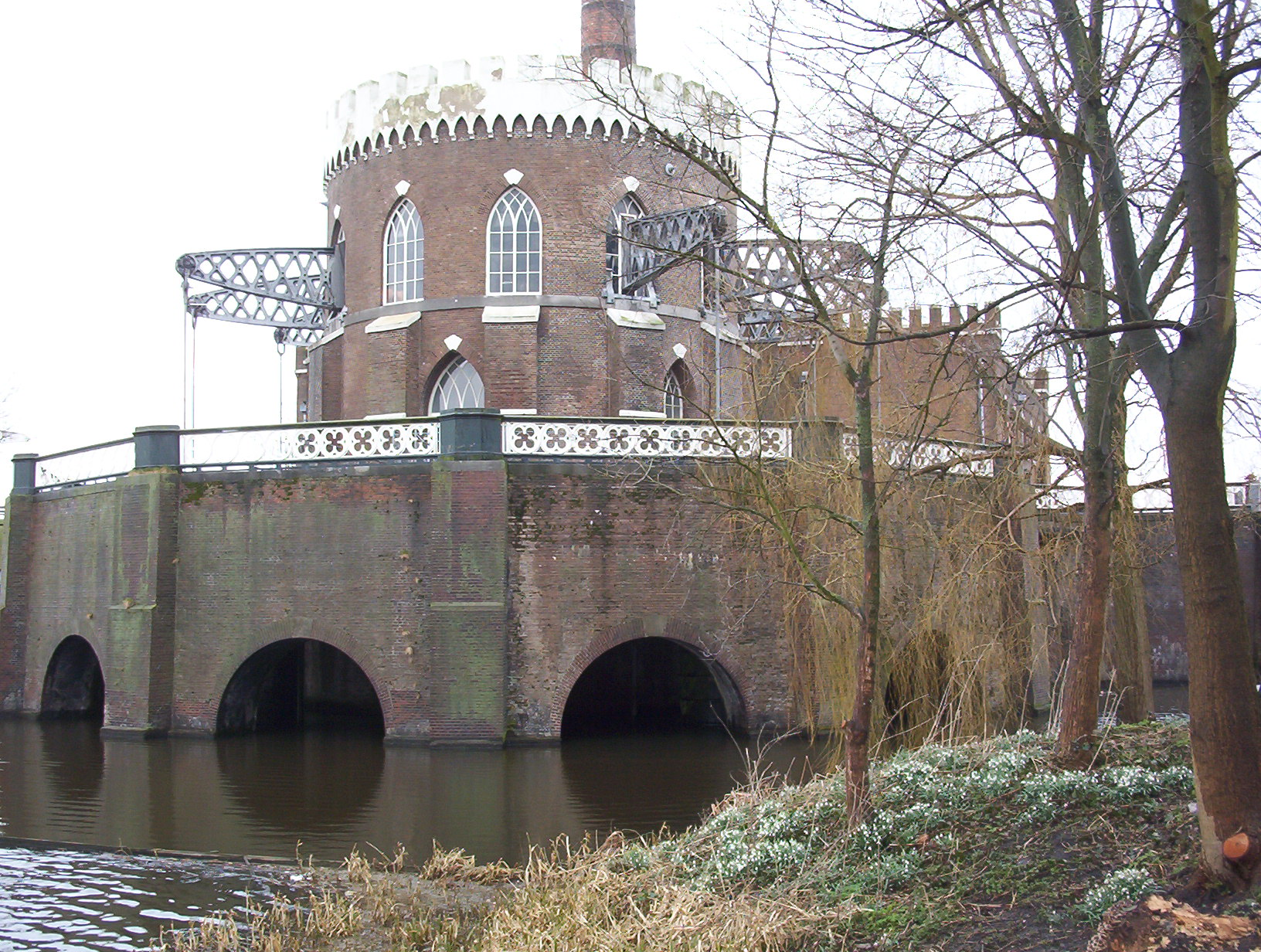
Back of Cruquiusmuseum, showing the beams of the pumping engine and the 9 meter drop in water level from the Spaarne river

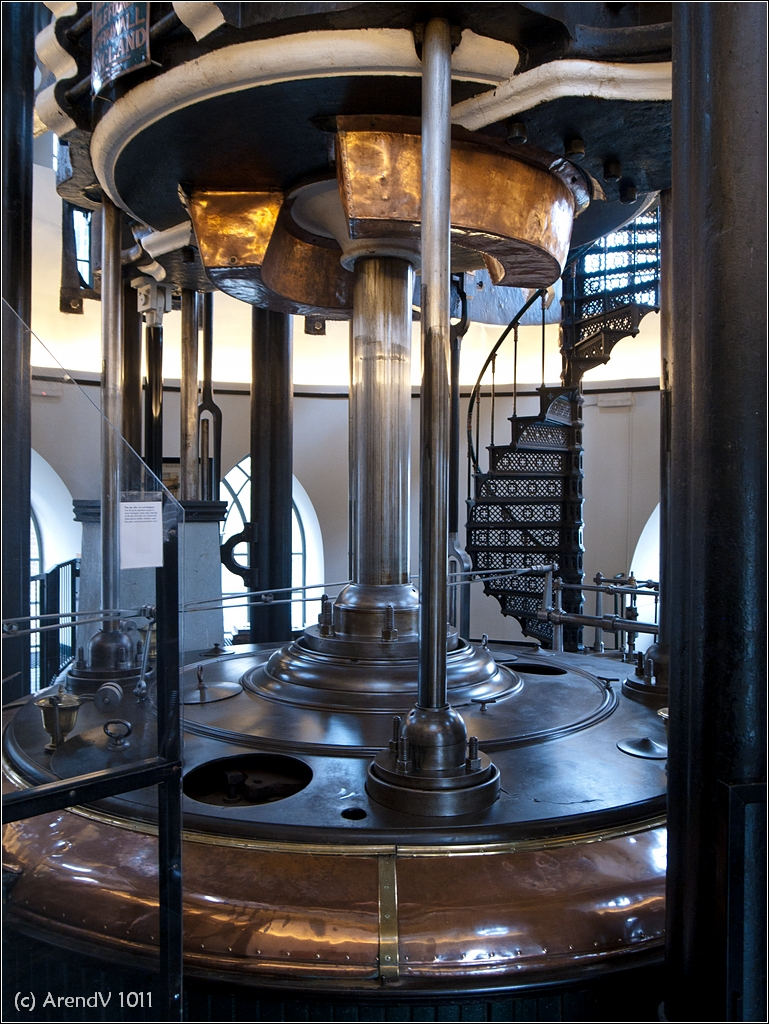
The steamengine made bij Harvey & Co from Hayle

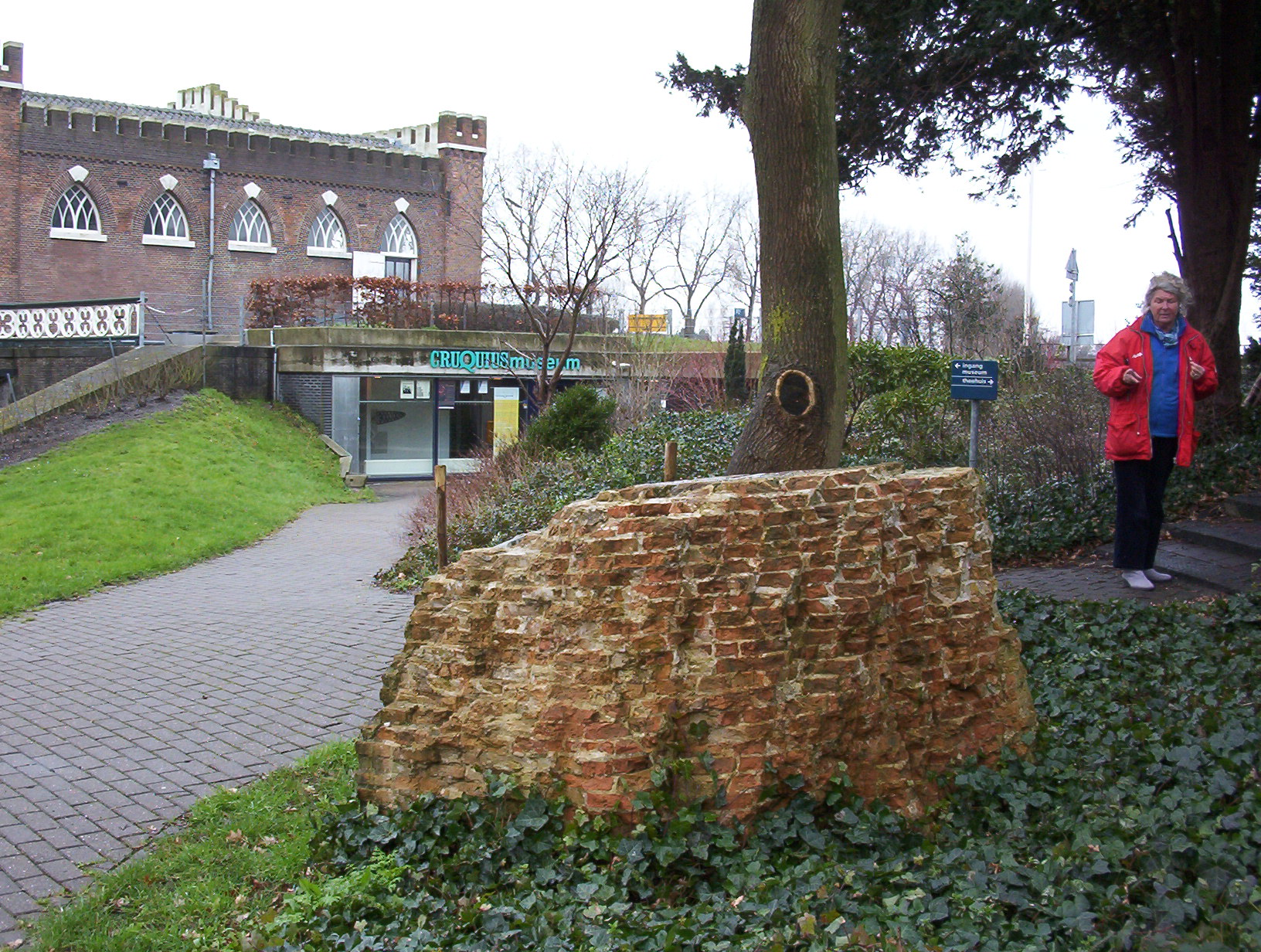
Cruquiusmuseum entrance, showing piece of foundation from first steam mill in the Netherlands

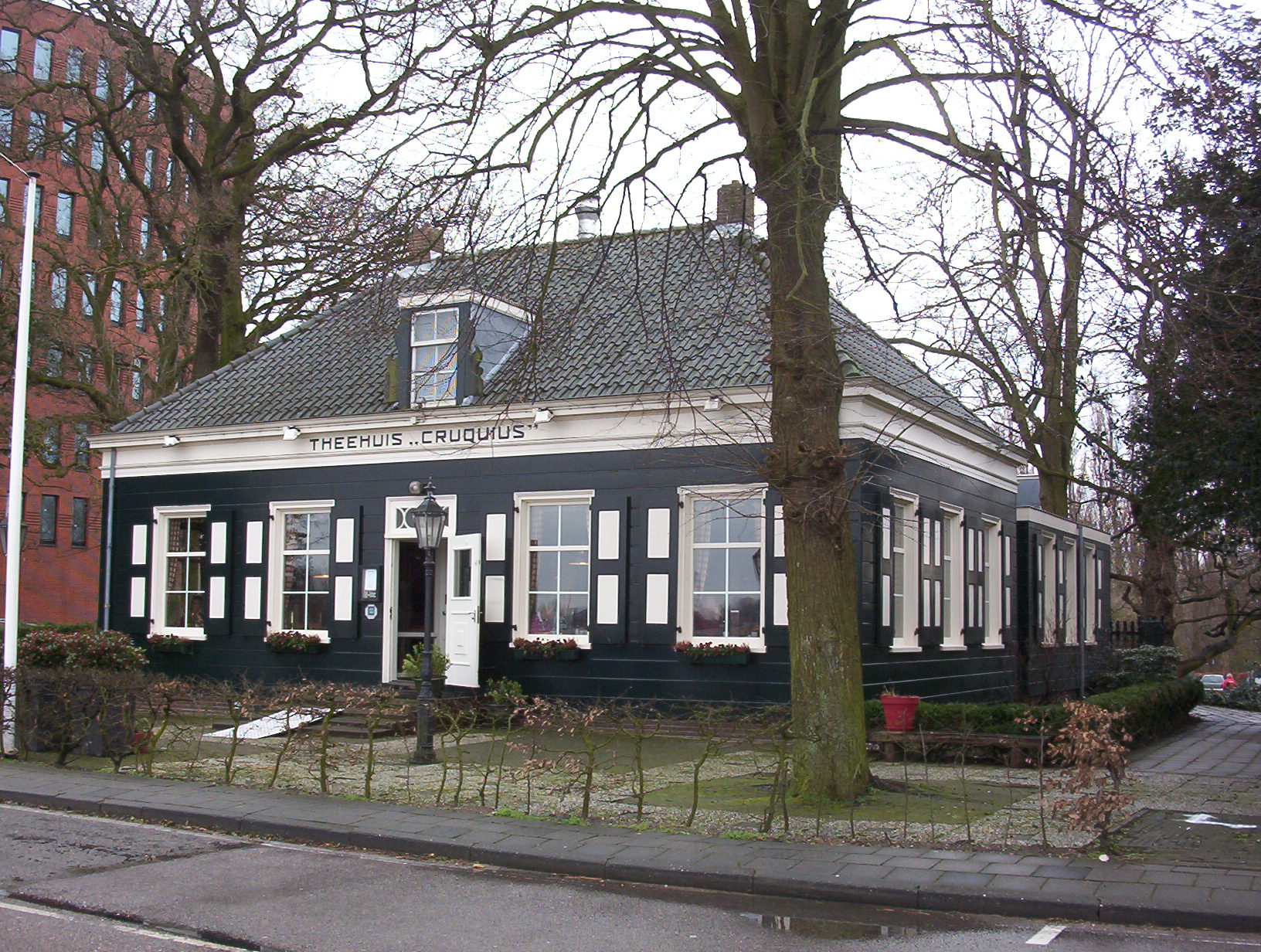
Café next to Cruquiusmuseum, former residence of steam mill foreman

The Museum De Cruquius (or Cruquiusmuseum) occupies the old Cruquius steam pumping station in Cruquius, the Netherlands. It derives its name from Nicolaas Kruik (1678–1754), a Dutch land-surveyor and one of many promoters of a plan to pump the Haarlemmermeer ('Haarlem lake') dry.

== Development ==
Like many well-educated men of his time, Nicolaas Kruik (1678–1754) Latinised his name to Nicolaus Samuel Cruquius. During Kruik's lifetime, the issue of the Haarlemmermeer and how to pump it dry was international news, as the following excerpt from the Virginia Gazette on 31 May 1751 illustrates:

"By a private letter from Rotterdam, we are told, that the Dutch Engineers, in their Plan for draining the lake of Haerlem, proposed to employ 150 mills for three Years, and had computed the Expence at a Million and Half of Florins, but that a German, who had been long employed in the Mines of Hungary and Hartz, had proposed to drain it with 50 machines, in 15 months, at a far less Expence; and that he has been ordered to erect one of those Machines, which, if it shall be found to execute what he has asserted, his Proposal will be immediately accepted."

Even 50 machines proved too expensive, so it was not until successful experiments with steam pumping stations, such as at nearby Groenendaal park in 1781, that serious plans resulted in three steam-driven pumping stations being established. As a tribute to former planners, the pumping stations of the Haarlemmermeer were named after them: Leeghwater, Lijnden and Cruquius.

Cruquius is thought to be the largest steam engine – and certainly the largest beam engine – ever built. The engine was built by Harvey & Co, of Hayle, Cornwall. It is an annular-compound steam engine, with two cylinders (one within the other). The diameter of the inner (High Pressure) cylinder is 2.1 metres (84 in); the diameter of the outer (Low Pressure) annular cylinder is 3.7 metres (144 in).

Cruquius pump station was positioned at the mouth of the Spaarne river, near Heemstede. To service the mill, the workers who lived there founded equally named town of Cruquius. The dike was built in the 1840s, the pump started work in 1850 and in the three years that had been predicted a century before, the Haarlemmermeer was pumped dry.

The pumping station Cruquius continued to work on and off until 1933, when it was made into a museum. The foreman's house was made into a café which it still is today.

== Heritage site ==
The pump house at Cruquius is a Netherlands 'Rijksmonument' for the historical engine. It has also been declared an Anchor Point of ERIH, The European Route of Industrial Heritage.

Outside, the ringvaart canal's system of sluices, mills, and bridges, are all part of the Stelling van Amsterdam, the main dike of which runs just north of Cruquius, through Vijfhuizen. Fort Vijfhuizen is used for art exhibitions and is a short walk north of the museum along the ringvaart. What is less known is that there is also a fort Cruquius, just south of the museum, that also has World Heritage status because of its link to the Stelling van Amsterdam.

The Cruquius Pumping Station was named a Historic Mechanical Engineering Landmark by the American Society of Mechanical Engineers in 1991.
