= Nicolaas Kruik =

- Born: 2 December 1678; West-Vlieland, Dutch Republic
- Died: 5 February 1754 (aged 75); Spaarndam, Dutch Republic
- Occupations: surveyor, cartographer, astronomer, and weatherman

Nicolaas Samuelszoon Kruik (Latin: Nicolaus Samuelis Cruquius; 2 December 1678 West-Vlieland – 5 February 1754 Spaarndam), also known as Nicolaes Krukius, was a Dutch surveyor, cartographer, astronomer and weather observer.

Cruquius took temperature measurements in Fahrenheit from 1706 to 1734. His historical calculations are still used today by the KNMI, the Dutch meteorological institute. He not only measured weather changes in wind speed, rainfall, air pressure, temperature, and humidity, but also measured sea level. His method of visualising planes of water level to illustrate contours of depth (isobaths) in his map of the Merwede (1730) was the first of its kind. He was an advocate of reclaiming the Haarlemmermeer, which was accomplished a century after his death and is commemorated by the Museum De Cruquius.

== Biography ==
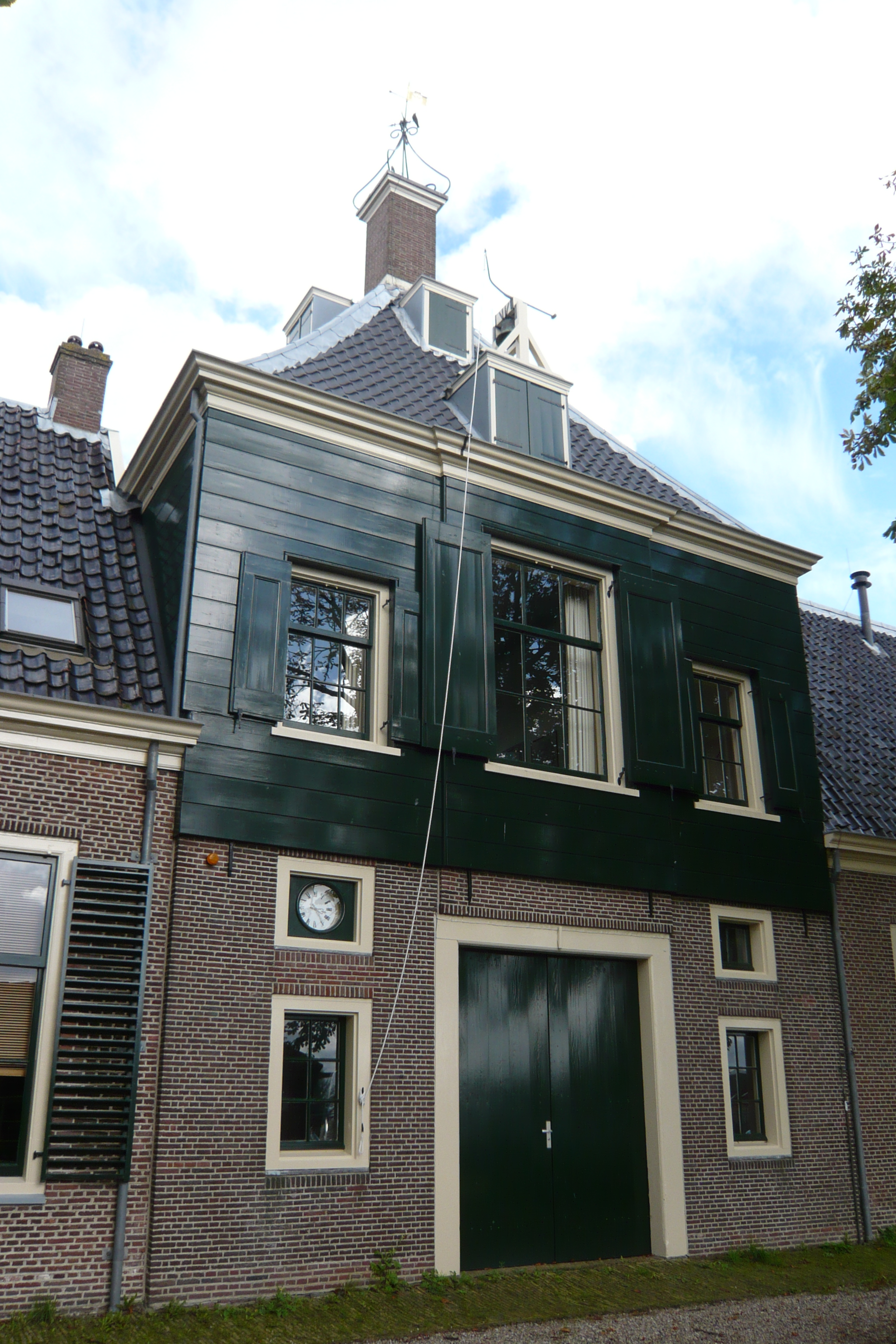
Rijnlandshuis, the Gemeenlandshuis where Cruquius lived and worked in Spaarndam

Though born in Vlieland, Cruquius moved to Delft in 1696. He became a surveyor at the age of 19, in 1697, and began to draw maps, a lucrative job in his day. In 1705 he started his first weather observations. In 1717 at the age of 39, though firmly established as a respected surveyor, he moved to the family farm in Rijnsburg outside Leiden and chose to study in Leiden under Herman Boerhaave, at that time the most famous scientist in the Netherlands. He signed himself in as "Krukius, medical student, born in Delft". Thanks to Boerhaave, Kruik became a member of the Royal Society of London. The secretary of the Royal Society at that time, James Jurin, started the first European network of meteorological weather stations, and the Dutch members played a large part. Kruik was elected a Fellow of the Royal Society in 1724.

In 1721 and 1723 Luigi Ferdinando Marsigli travelled to Holland and he and Boerhaave stimulated Kruik to keep systematic observations in the belief that climate changes had an effect on public health. Kruik started to travel the various beaches and rivers in the Netherlands and study the water levels while continuing his map-making work. On these trips he was sometimes accompanied by Boerhaave and Marsigli. While studying the Merwede, he began to form plans to help keep the lower areas of the Netherlands dry.

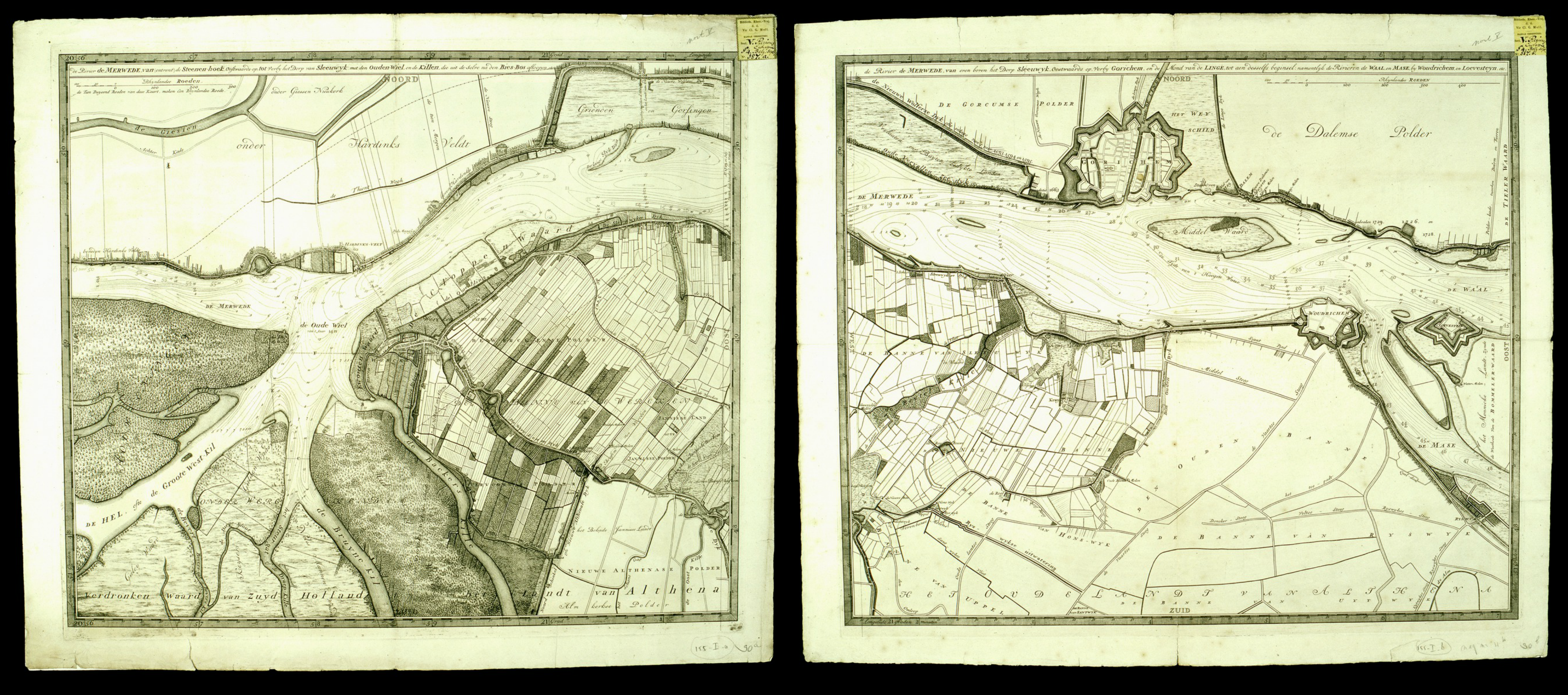
Kruik's c. 1730 map of the Merwede, the first full-scale depiction of contours of depth (isobaths).

It was at this time that Kruik changed his name to the Latin Cruquius after his first publications of maps and measurements. In 1725 he wrote a famous letter to Herman Boerhaave, proposing an empirical deductive research method to solve the water problems of the Netherlands. This letter started the chain of events in working that eventually led to a plan presented to the United Provinces to create a water defense plan in 1727. He later worked with Willem 's Gravesande, a Dutch professor of physics and astronomy at Leiden in a special committee to advise on flooding risk at the river Merwede, which led to his first map with isobaths.

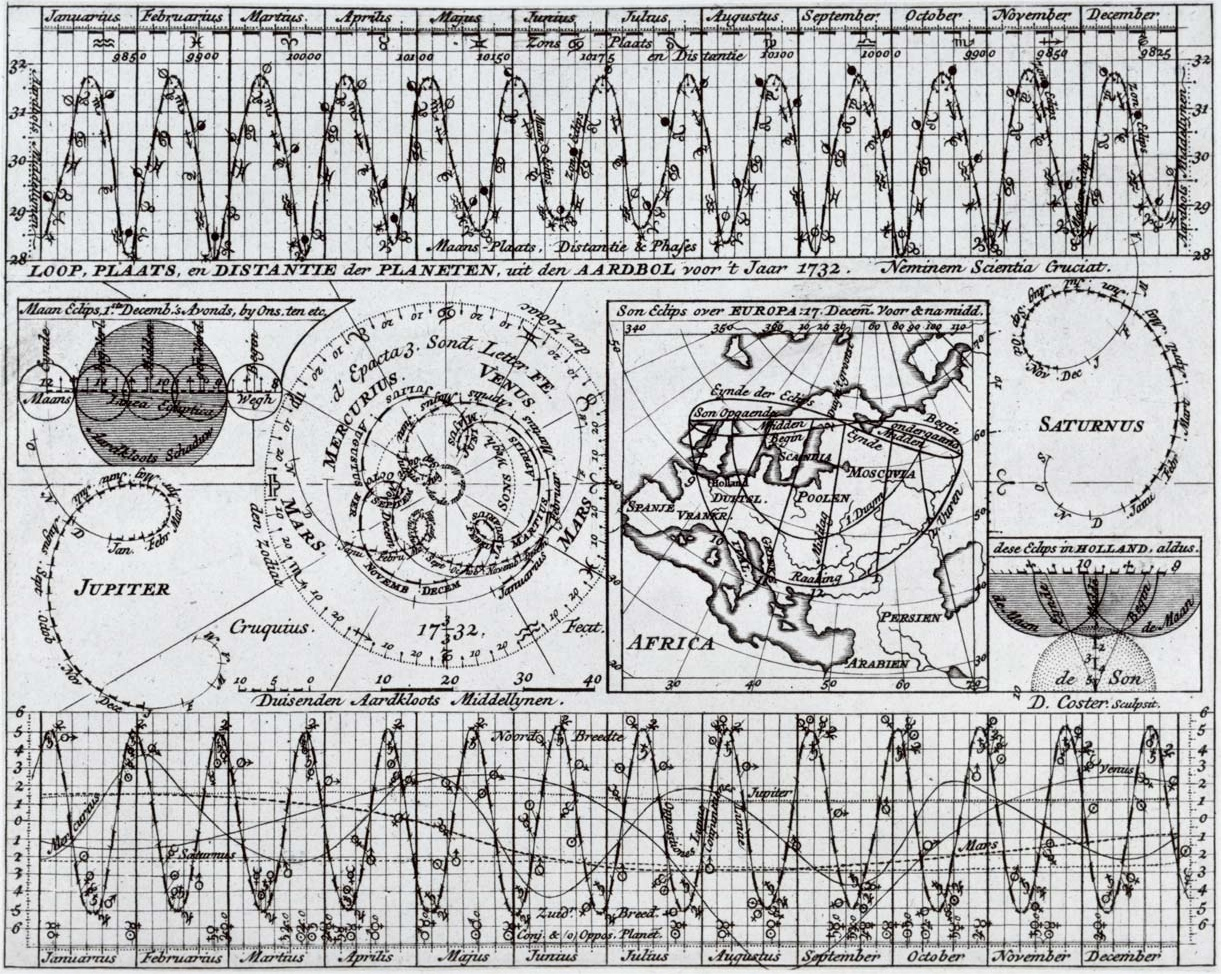
Diagram showing the distance of the planets to the earth in 1732, also showing a complete lunar eclipse and a partial solar eclipse in that year

In 1733 he became a member of the 'Hoogheemraadschap Rijnland', a Dutch Waterboard Agency, and worked as a Waterboard inspector in Spaarndam. It was here that he met Jan Noppen (1706–1734), the Halfweg inspector, who started the earliest continuous weather station in Zwanenburg with measurements three times daily of temperature, air pressure, humidity, and rainfall.
