= West-Vlieland =

Coordinates: 53°12′12″N 4°52′59″E

- Village
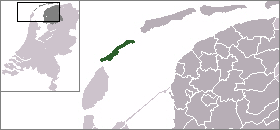
- Country: Netherlands
- Province: Friesland

Population (1670)
  - Total: 2,000−2,500
  - 2020: 0

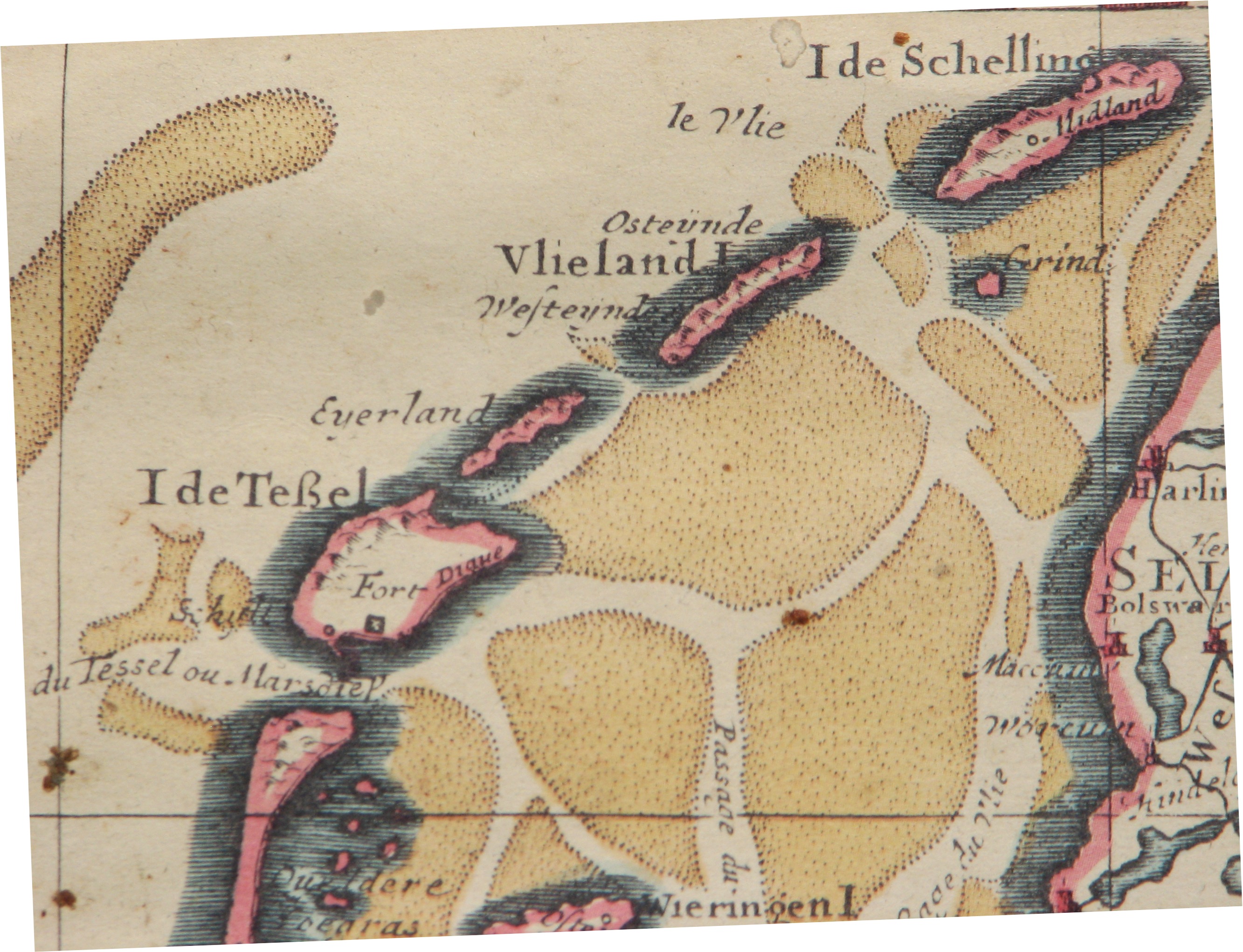
Map dated 1743 showing Westeynde

West-Vlieland (also known as Westeyende) (West Frisian: West-Flylân) was a village on the island of Vlieland in the province of Friesland, the Netherlands. It was gradually lost to the advance of the sea, by 1736 only two houses remained. The site of the village was in 1857 15 fathoms (27 m) below sea level. The village had its own town hall, church, school, poorhouse and a mill which was built in 1647 and by 1670 it had between 2.000 and 2.500 inhabitants, making it a large and prosperous village. Half a century later it counted only 750 people. Many of the inhabitants worked on the seas, whaling or trading on the Baltic Sea. At the beginning of the seventeenth century, the town had a famous bar and a military storage. At the end of the 17th century the village began to decline: in a few decades the plague visited the village multiple times, sailors were increasingly assailed by Dunkirker pirates, and the village began to be increasingly difficult to reach due to sand accumulation while the village itself was slowly devoured by the seas. All of this led to East Vlieland increasingly outcompeting its neighbour until West-Vlieland disappeared entirely.
