= Dutch Cancer Society =

The Dutch Cancer Society (DCS; in Dutch: 'KWF Kankerbestrijding' ) is a Dutch Society committed to fight cancer by scientific research, education, patient support and fundraising in cooperation with volunteers, donors, patients, doctors and researchers. By this commitment, DCS targets less cancer, more cures and a higher quality of life for cancer patients. Its motto is, 'Everyone Deserves a Tomorrow' .

== Establishment ==
The Dutch Cancer Society was established in 1949. Her Majesty Wilhelmina, Queen of the Netherlands at that time, celebrated her Golden Jubilee in 1948 and received a 'National Gift', an amount of almost two million Dutch guilders (currently this would be worth over €8 million), which she decided to dedicate to the fight against cancer. The Queen Wilhelmina Fund Foundation ( 'Stichting Koningin Wilhelmina Fonds' ) was established in March 1949 to manage this money. A group of Amsterdam dignitaries established the Society for Support of the Queen Wilhelmina Fund ( 'Vereniging tot Steun aan het Koningin Wilhelmina Fonds' ) in that same month, to raise funds so the Foundation would be able to continue its work after having spent the National Gift. The Society and Foundation merged to one organization led by a Board on 1 June 2007.

== Funding ==
The Dutch Cancer Society does not receive any financial support from the Government. While its annual door-to-door fundraising is an important source of revenues, the Society also receives donations from over 800,000 regular donors and lottery participants (almost 5% of the total Dutch population, being around 17 million) and from approx. 20,000 companies. DCS shares in the revenues of several national lotteries, organizes its own season lotteries, and it obtains over 40% of its revenues from inheritances. The Society has over 1,600 local divisions throughout the country. Hundreds of individuals each year organize fundraising actions for DCS, for example Alpe d'HuZes, Ride for the Roses and local events derived from the US Relay for Life concept. Just over 64,000 guilders (currently worth approx. 250,000 euros) were gathered in 1949; in 2008 nearly a 100 million euros were fundraised.

== Use of revenues ==
80% of the budget after deduction of costs (16% of the revenues) is spent on scientific research. The Dutch Cancer Society does not conduct any research itself, but it funds scientific research at universities and other research institutes. While DCS facilitates approximately half of cancer research conducted in the Netherlands, the Government does so for the other half. DCS has invested in about 350 ongoing research projects. It spent 54 million euros at research and researcher education in 2008. The Dutch Cancer Society bases its education of patients and the general public on knowledge obtained by research on the occurrence and treatment of cancer. The Society spent 17 million euros (20% of its budget) to education and patient support in 2008.

== Sources ==
- (in Dutch) Official website
- (in Dutch) Goede Doelen Gids / 2010 (2009) ISBN 9789075458800, Lenthe Publishers & Consultants - Amstelveen (Charity Guide)
