= Hoofddorp railway station =

Railway station in the Netherlands

Hoofddorp
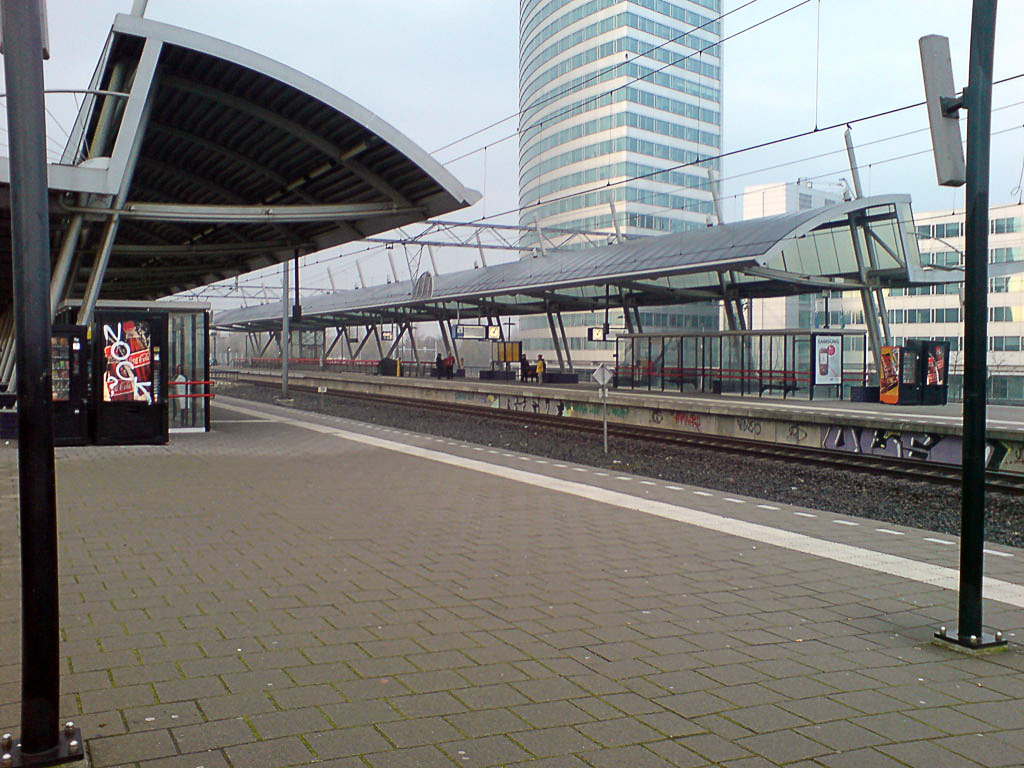

General information
- Location: Netherlands
- Coordinates: 52°17′36″N 4°42′0″E
- Operator: Nederlandse Spoorwegen
- Platforms: 4

Construction
- Parking: yes

Other information
- Station code: Hfd

History
- Opened: 1981; 45 years ago
Services
Preceding station	Nederlandse Spoorwegen	Following station
Terminus	NS Sprinter 4100	Schiphol Airport towards Hoorn Kersenboogerd
Nieuw Vennep towards Den Haag Centraal	NS Sprinter 4300	Schiphol Airport towards Lelystad Centrum
Nieuw Vennep towards Leiden Centraal	NS Sprinter 5700 Weekdays before 20:30	Schiphol Airport towards Utrecht Centraal
Terminus	NS Sprinter 5700 Weekends	Schiphol Airport towards Utrecht Centraal
Terminus	NS Sprinter 8100	Schiphol Airport towards Amsterdam Centraal
Terminus	NS Sprinter 8200	Schiphol Airport towards Amsterdam Centraal
Terminus	NS Sprinter 8300	Schiphol Airport towards Amsterdam Centraal
Terminus	NS Sprinter 8400	Schiphol Airport towards Amsterdam Centraal
Location
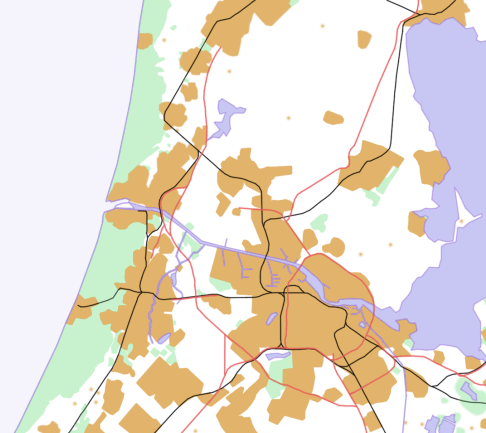
- Location within Northern Randstad Location within Netherlands

Hoofddorp is a railway station in Hoofddorp, Netherlands located on the Weesp–Leiden railway.

== History ==
From 1912 to 1935 the town had a station also called Hoofddorp nearer to the town centre at the ceased Hoofddorp–Leiden railway (Haarlemmermeerspoorlijn from Aalsmeer to Haarlem, via Hoofddorp and Leiden). The former station building is in use as a residence.

The current station opened on 31 May 1981. The station was rebuilt in 1998 to its current look.

Hoofddorp has a depot/sidings further west from the station, this is the reason many sprinter services have their terminus over here. Intercity services terminating at Schiphol also use this depot before returning. The station consist of 2 double-track platforms and has 6 tracks. Regular bus services stop at street level below the station. ZuidTangent bus rapid transit lines 300 and 310 use the platform level stop next to the station.

== Train services ==
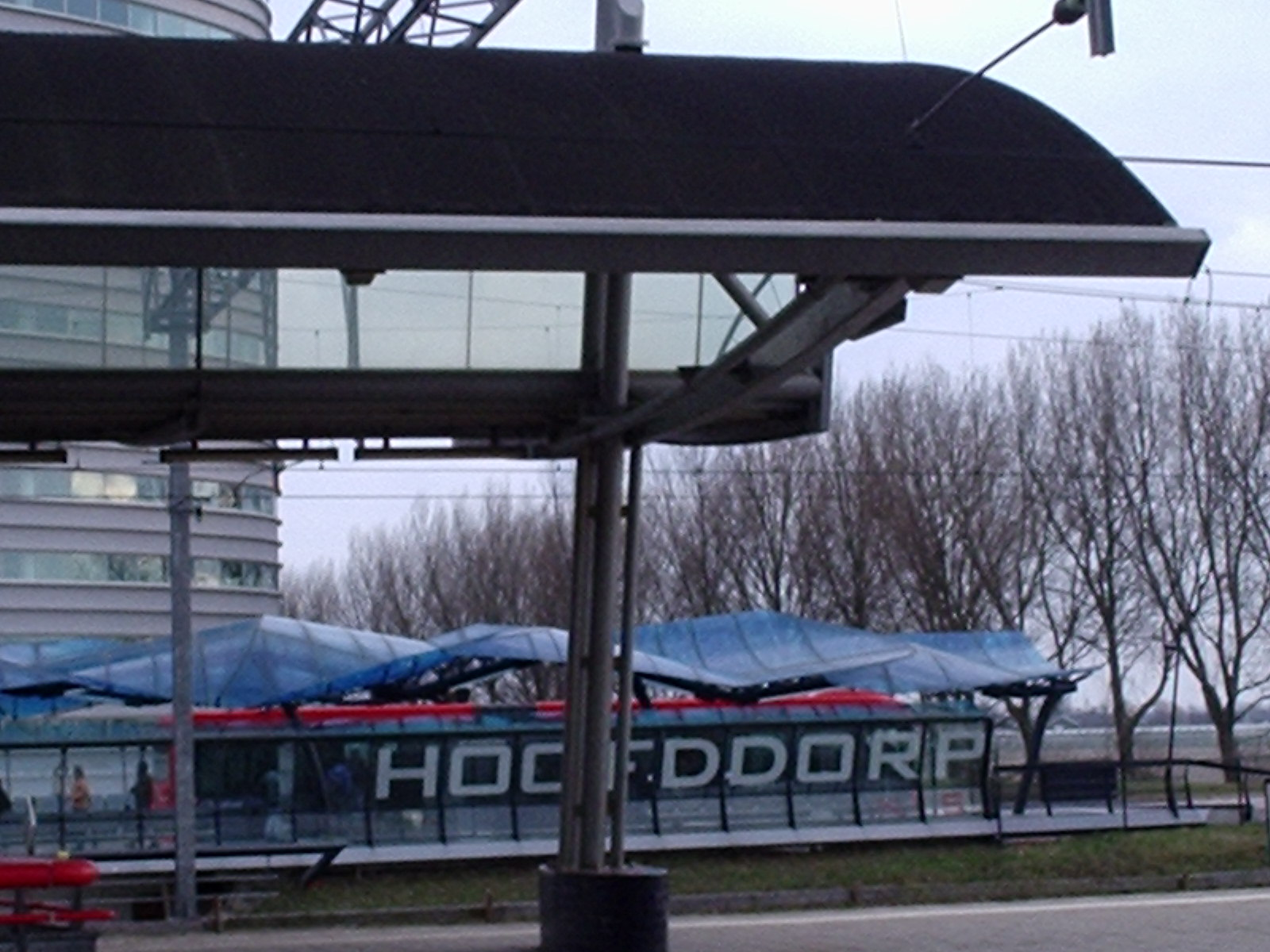
Hoofddorp railway station (front) and bus rapid transit stop (back)

As of 15 December 2025, the following train services call at this station:

- 2× per hour local Sprinter service Hoofddorp - Schiphol - Amsterdam Sloterdijk - Zaandam - Hoorn
- 2× per hour local Sprinter service Hoofddorp - Schiphol - Amsterdam Zuid - Almere
- 8× per hour local Sprinter service Hoofddorp - Schiphol - Amsterdam CS
- 2x per hour local Sprinter service (Leiden -) Hoofddorp - Schiphol - Amsterdam Zuid - Naarden-Bussum - Hilversum - Utrecht Centraal

== Bus services ==
The following bus services call at Station Hoofddorp. Buses depart from the bus stops at street level below the station. Lines 300 and 397 depart at the viaduct next to the station. All buses are operated by Connexxion.

Bus	Route	Notes
Regional services
145	Hoofddorp Station - City Centre - Noord - Lijnden - Badhoevedorp	
161	Hoofddorp Station - Beukenhorst West - Kalorama - Arnolduspark - City Centre - Pax - Noord - Lijnden - Boesingheliede - Zwanenburg - Halfweg-Zwanenburg railway station - Zwanenburg Kinheim	
162	Hoofddorp Station - City Centre - Graan voor Visch - Nieuw-Vennep, Spoorzicht - Station Nieuw Vennep - Nieuw Vennep Getsewoud - Lisserbroek - Centrum	
401	Hoofddorp Station - City Centre - Overbos - Spaarne Ziekenhuis - Zwaanshoek - Bennebroek	"Buurtbus"
City services
169	Hoofddorp Station - City Centre - Toolenburg - Overbos - Spaarne Gasthuis (Floriande - SKWA)	Only once an hour to SKWA
R-net
300	Haarlem - Vijfhuizen - Spaarne Gasthuis - Overbos - Bornholm - Toolenburg - Graan voor Visch - Hoofddorp Station - Schiphol - Amstelveen - Ouderkerk a/d Amstel - Amsterdam Bijlmer ArenA	At night as N30
N30	Haarlem - Vijfhuizen - Spaarne Gasthuis - Overbos - Bornholm - Toolenburg - Graan voor Visch - Hoofddorp Station - Schiphol - Amstelveen - Ouderkerk a/d Amstel - Amsterdam Bijlmer ArenA	At night as N30
397	Nieuw-Vennep Getsewoud - Hoofddorp Toolenburg-Zuid, -Oost - Graan voor Visch - Hoofddorp Station - Schiphol - Amsterdam Metro Amstelveenseweg - Amsterdam City Centre - Leidseplein - Busstation Elandsgracht	
340	Haarlem - Heemstede - Cruquius - Spaarne Gasthuis - Overbos - Geniedijk - City Centre - Hoofddorp Station - Schiphol Logistics Park - Aalsmeer - Uithoorn	
341	Amsterdam Zuid - VU medisch centrum - Amstelveenseweg - Schiphol Noord - Schiphol Airport - Schiphol Southwest - De Hoek - "Hoofddorp Station" - City Centre - Pax - Floriande - Spaarne Gasthuis	
