= Atlas Professionals =

Atlas NextWave is a Dutch provider of recruitment and HR services within the energy and marine sectors globally, and has its headquarters in Schiphol.

== History ==
Leo Burghouwt, Theo Klinkenberg and Thea Biemans establish the company in 1982 in Weesp, initially as an agent for worldwide transport over water. In 1986, the company expanded into personnel services for waterway contracting and started trading under the name of Atlas Personnel Services (initially Atlas Transport Services).

In 1999, René Neelissen and Marcel Burghouwt became shareholders and Managing Directors of the company. In that year, the company name was changed to Atlas Services Group and the first acquisition was completed. The acquisitions of Eurosailor BV in 1999 and of Tristar Well Service Pool BV in 2000, are the key factors in the buy and build of personnel services within the marine and energy industries. In the following decades, Atlas aims to grow through mergers and acquisitions. From 1999 until 2014, Atlas acquires parties in a wide range of specific market segments in the energy and marine industries.

In 2011, HAL Investments BV (European investment subsidiary of HAL Holding NV, listed on Euronext Amsterdam), takes 45% interest in Atlas Services Group.

In 2013, the company's trading name was changed to Atlas Professionals.

In 2016, HAL Investments BV purchased an additional 25% interest.

== Services ==
The company has offices in eighteen countries and provides specialist recruitment and HR services within the following fields of expertise:

1. Drilling & Well Services
2. Energy
3. Marine
4. Renewable Energy
5. Seismic
6. Hydrographic Survey
7. ROV, AUV & Underwater Inspection
8. Management & Quality Control
9. Catering
10. Dredging & Port Construction
11. Marine Environmental
12. QHSE

== Executive committee ==
Boris Kasteel - Chief Executive Officer (CEO) (since 2020)

Colin Seyger - Chief Financial Officer (CFO) (since 2021)

== Offices Around The World ==
Asia

Indonesia, Jakarta Energy & Marine

Singapore, Singapore City Offshore Marine, Offshore Survey & Construction, ROV, Diving & Inspection

Taiwan, Taipei Renewables

Timor Leste, Dili Catering

United Arab Emirates, Abu Dhabi Drilling & Marine

Europe

Netherlands, Hoofddorp (Headquarters) HR, Marketing, Finance, ICT & Legal

Netherlands, Capelle a/d IJssel Dredging & Port Construction, Offshore Marine, Merchant Shipping

Netherlands, Hoofddorp Discipline Engineering & Project Controls, Platforms & Jack Ups, Production & Maintenance

Netherlands, Urk Dredging & Port Construction

Netherlands, Vlissingen Renewables

Cyprus, Limassol Dredging & Port Construction, Offshore Marine, Merchant Shipping

Latvia, Riga Dredging & Port Construction, Offshore Marine, Merchant Shipping, Platforms & Jack Ups

Norway, Stavanger Drilling & Well Services, Platforms & Jack Ups

Spain, Vic Seismic & Electromagnetic, Marine Environmental

Ukraine, Odesa Platforms & Jack Ups, Production & Maintenance, Dredging & Port Construction, Offshore Marine, Merchant Shipping

United Kingdom, Bristol Renewables, Management & QC

United Kingdom, Newquay Offshore Survey & Construction, ROV, Diving & Inspection

United Kingdom, Aberdeen Drilling & Marine

Oceania

Australia, Perth Energy, Marine & Catering

New Zealand, New Plymouth Energy, Marine & Catering

South America

Brazil, Rio de Janeiro Production & Maintenance, Platforms & Jack Ups, Discipline Engineering & Project Controls, Drilling, Offshore Marine, Dredging & Port Construction, Offshore Survey & Construction

United States

Houston, Texas Energy & Marine

Massachusetts, Boston Energy & Renewables

== Sponsorship ==
Sports

- Alpe d'HuZes. In 2012, Atlas Professionals made its debut at the event. Over 35,000 Euros were collected for the Dutch Cancer Society. The year after, the company collected more than 50,000 for the charity fund.
- AZ. The role of René Neelissen (member of Atlas Professionals' Executive Committee) as chairman of AZ's Supervisory Board, led to Atlas' sponsorship of this Dutch football club. Since 2013, the company has seats within the AZ Offshore Energy Business Unit.
- Harlingen-Terschelling Sloepenroeirace. This yearly rowing event takes place on the Dutch Waddenzee. For more than 30 years, Atlas Professionals sponsors both the event, and the STC rowing team from the Maritime Academy in Rotterdam.
- North Sea Energy Soccer Cup. Various companies within the oil and gas industry come together on this yearly soccer event. Atlas Professionals started sponsoring the Cup in 2013.
- Sliedrecht Sport, first female A-league team. In 2012, and 2013, the female team of Sliedrecht Sport won the Dutch championships. Atlas Professionals started sponsoring the team in 2013.

Other

- Stichting Pastoraat Werkers Overzee. Atlas financially supports this foundation that focuses on improving the wellbeing of Dutch employees who works overseas.
