= Sassenheim railway station =

Railway station in the Netherlands

Sassenheim
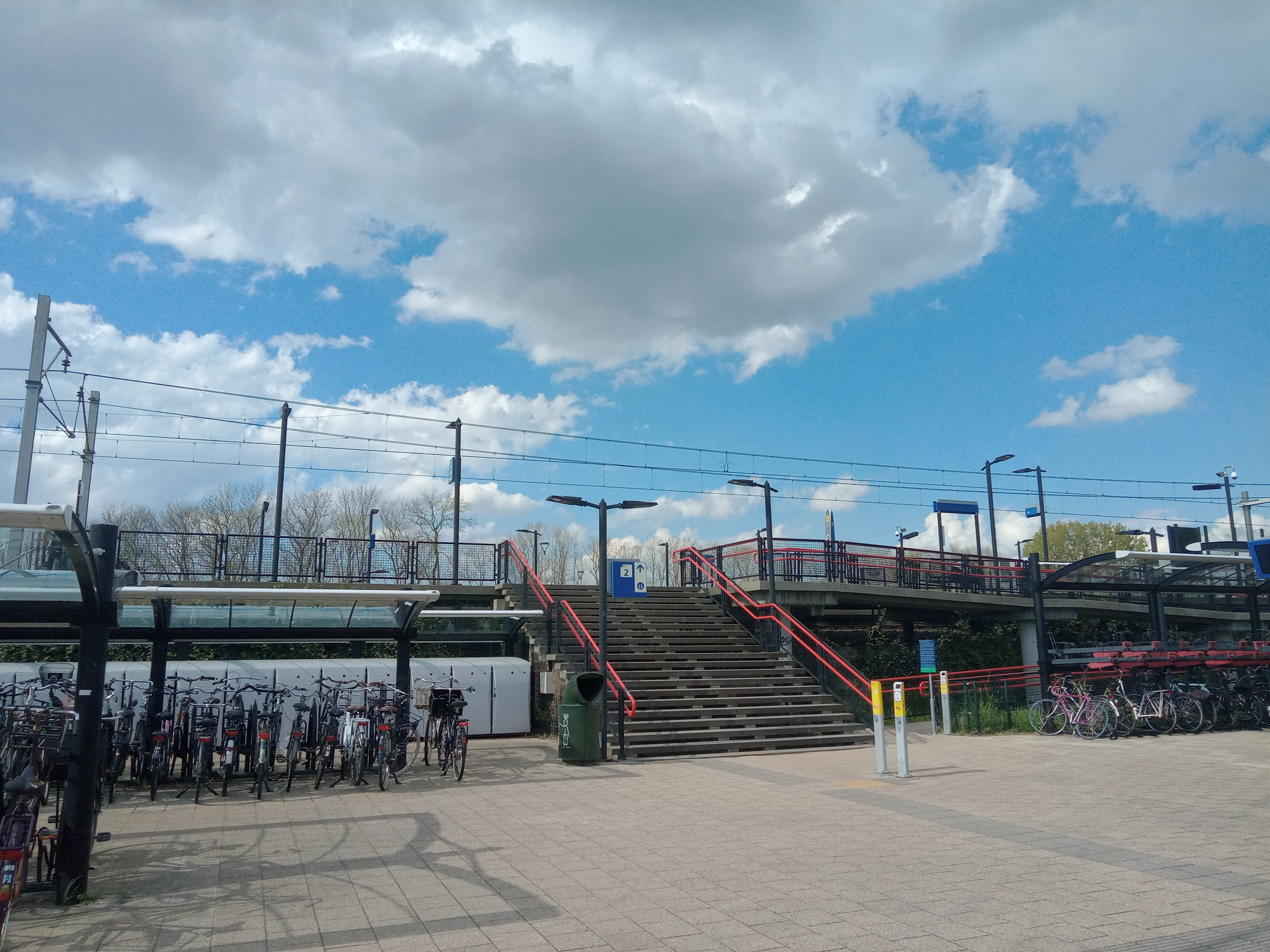

General information
- Location: Netherlands
- Coordinates: 52°13′02″N 4°31′34″E

History
- Opened: 9 December 2011

Services
Preceding station	Nederlandse Spoorwegen	Following station
Leiden Centraal towards Den Haag Centraal	NS Sprinter 4300	Nieuw-Vennep towards Lelystad Centrum
Leiden Centraal Terminus	NS Sprinter 5700 Weekdays before 20:30	Nieuw-Vennep towards Utrecht Centraal
Location
- Location within Netherlands

Sassenheim is a railway station in Sassenheim, Netherlands and is situated on the Schiphollijn (Weesp - Leiden). Construction began in 2009 and the station was opened on 9 December 2011, while train services started on 11 December 2011. The station has 2 platforms.

== Train service ==
As of 11 December 2016, the following train services call at this station:

- 2x per hour local Sprinter service Leiden - Schiphol - Amsterdam - Zaandam - Hoorn
- 2x per hour local Sprinter service The Hague - Leiden - Schiphol - Amsterdam - Almere - Lelystad - Zwolle

== Bus services ==
- Arriva 50 Leiden - Sassenheim - Lisse - Hillegom - Haarlem
- Arriva Qliner 361 Schiphol - Lisse - Sassenheim
- Arriva Qliner 385 Sassenheim - Voorhout - Noordwijk - Katwijk - Wassenaar - Den Haag

== Images ==
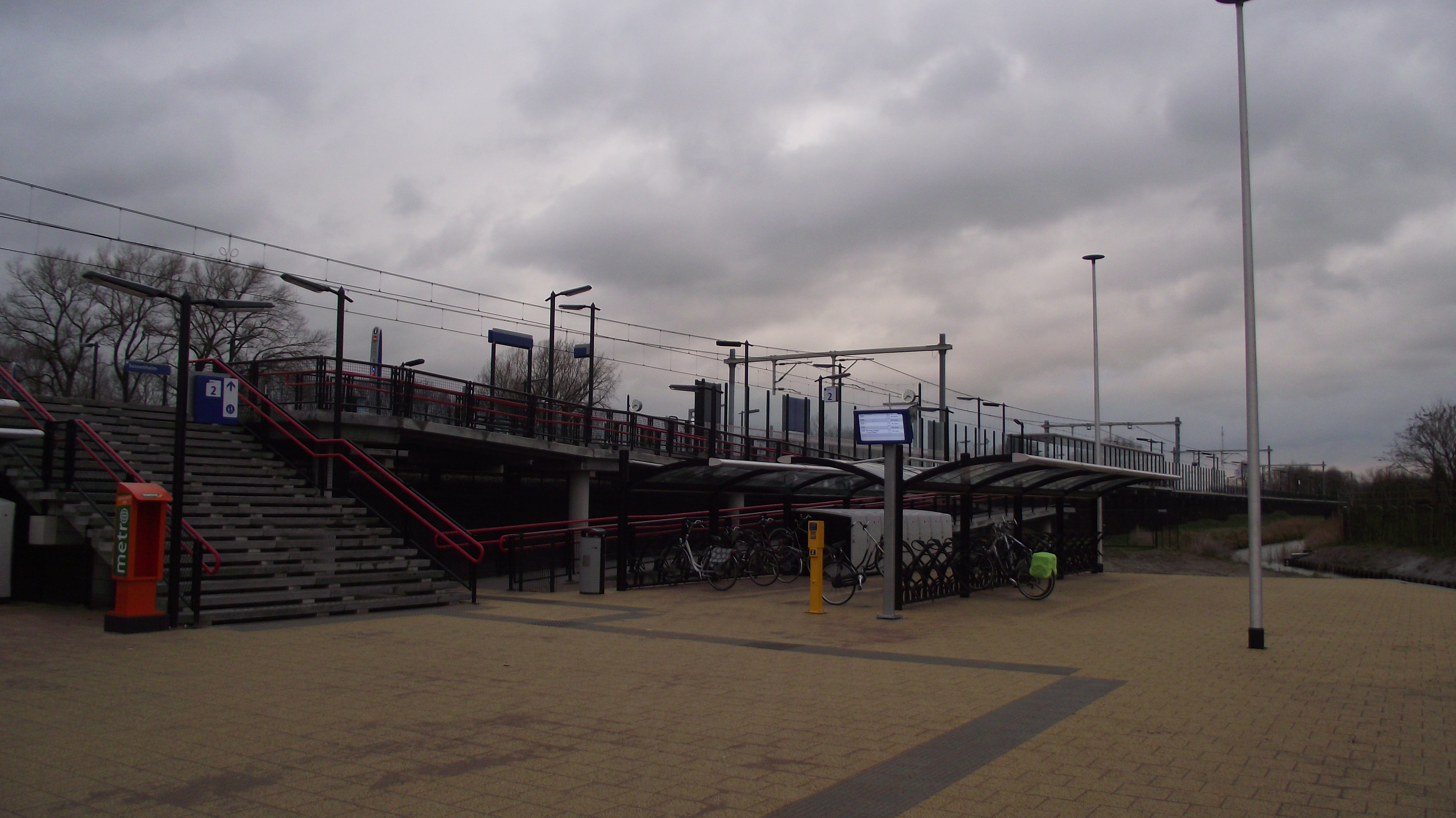
The station shortly after its opening in December 2011.

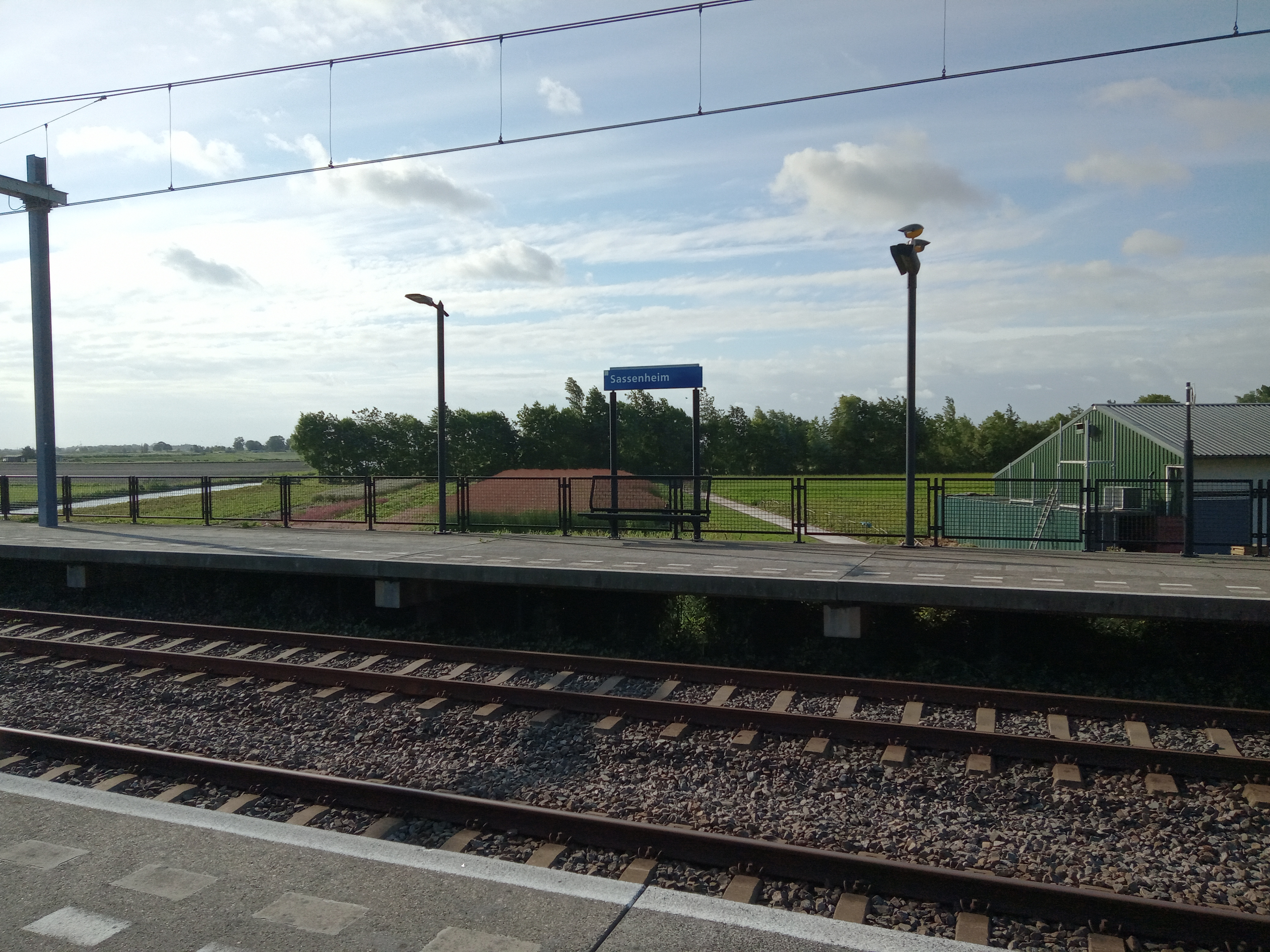
Platform 2, a meadow behind it.

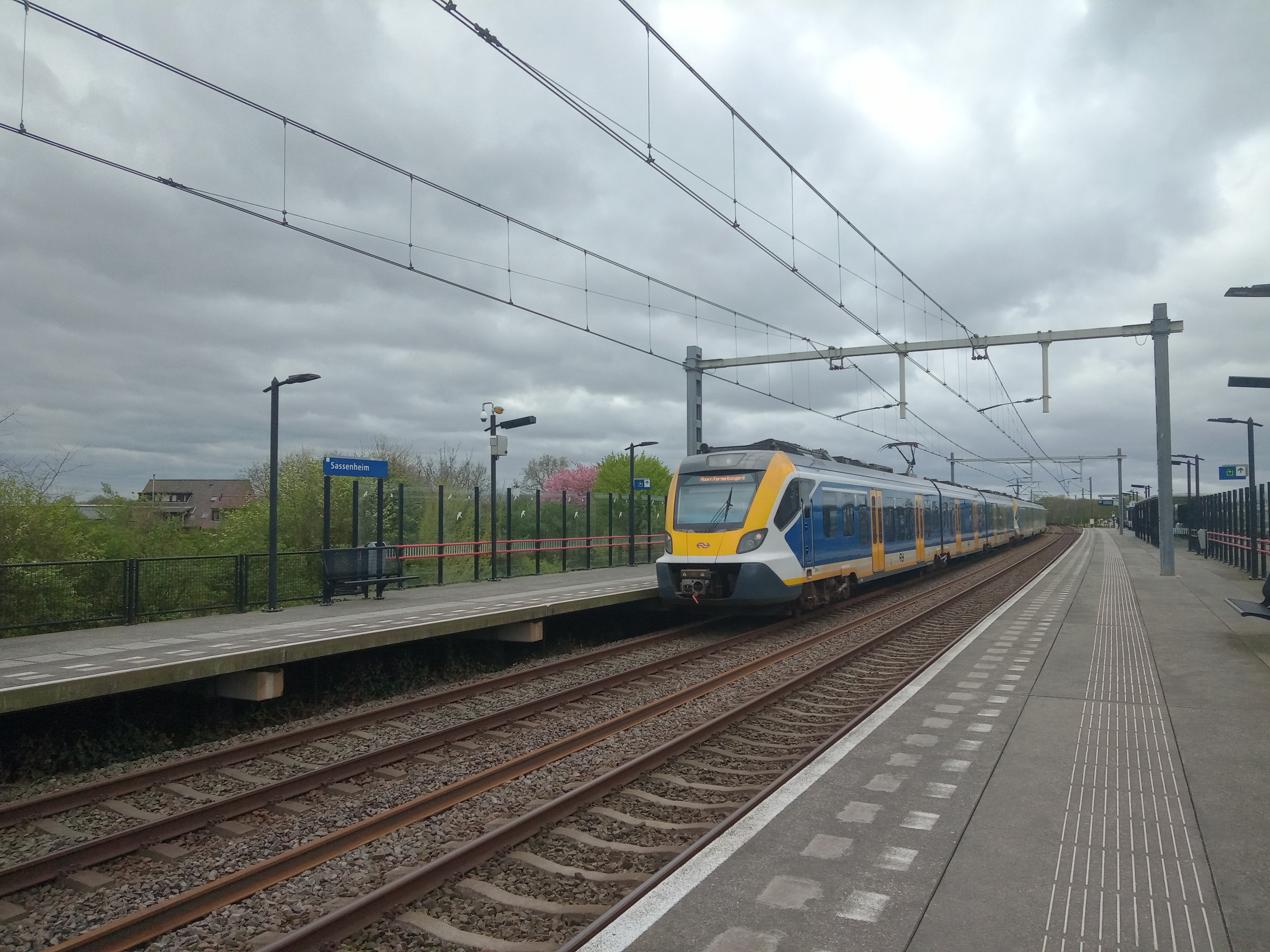
Sprinter train at the station.

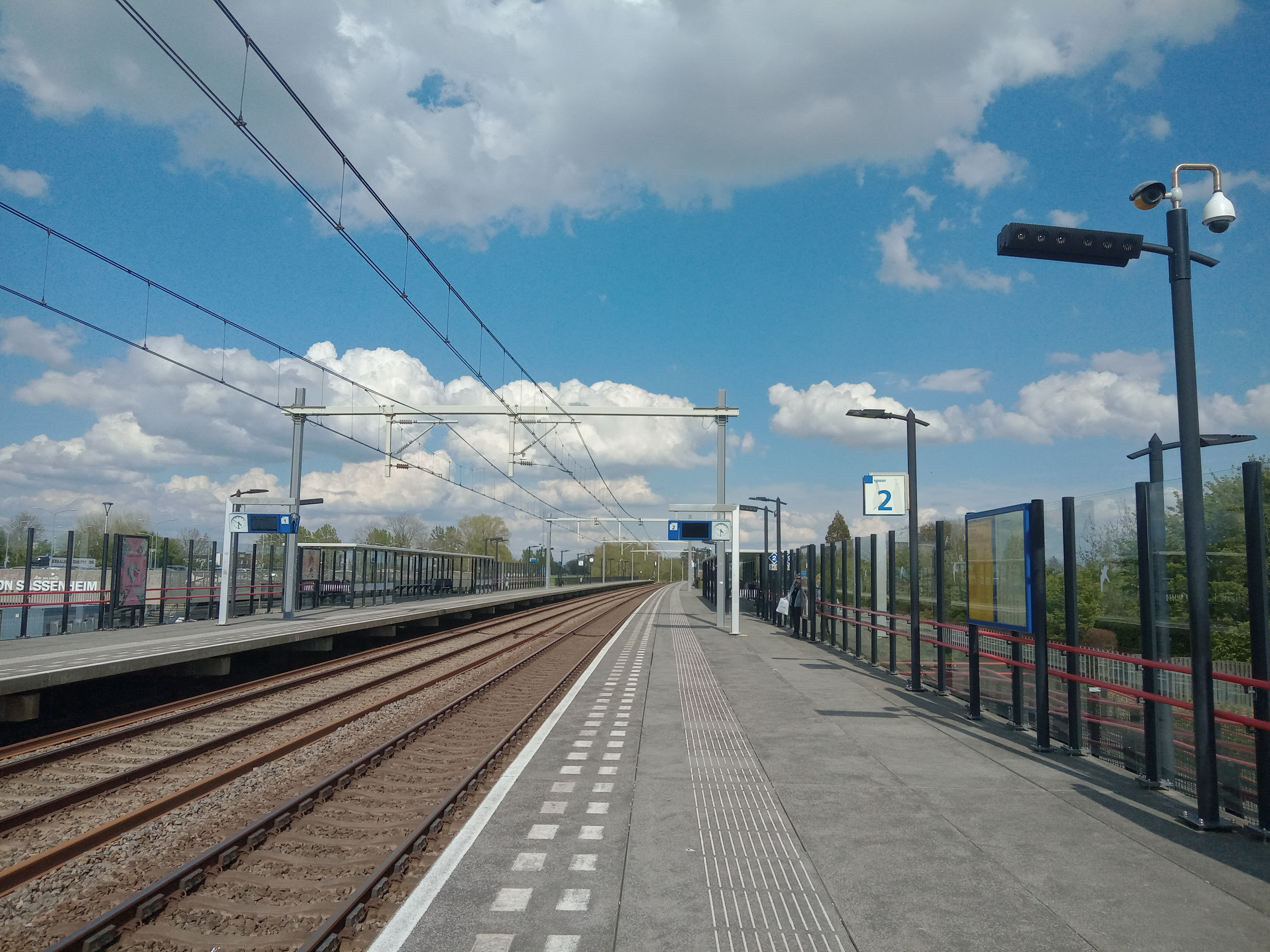
The platforms
