= Zuidtangent =

Bus rapid transit service in the Netherlands

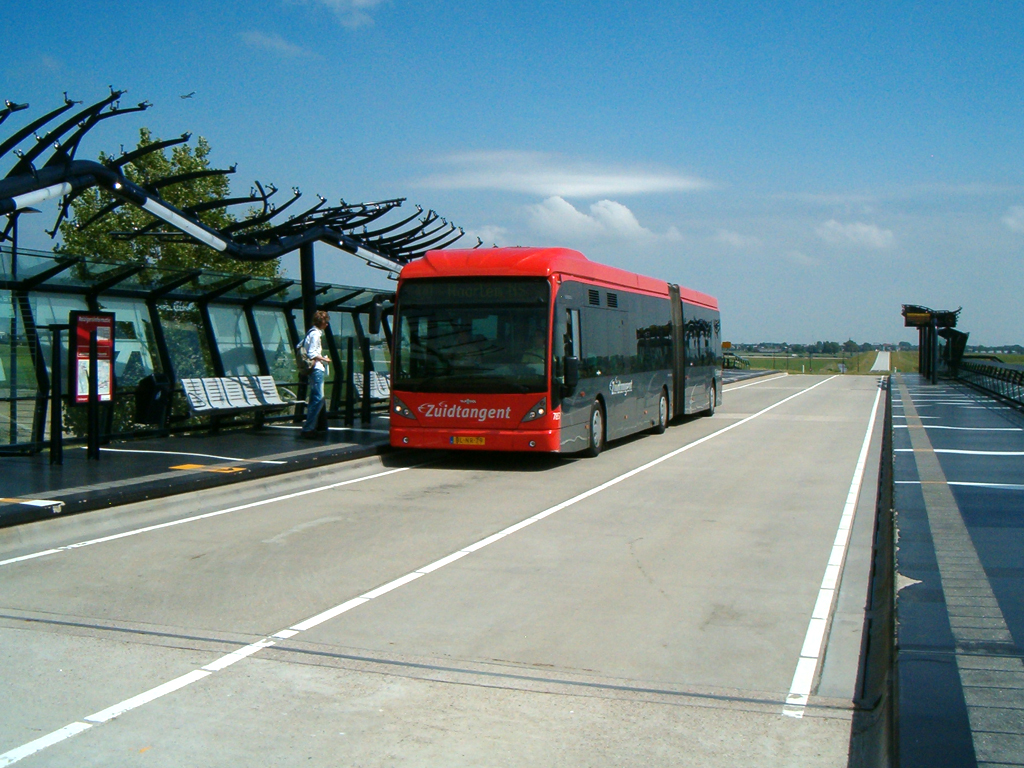
Zuidtangent bus at a bus stop

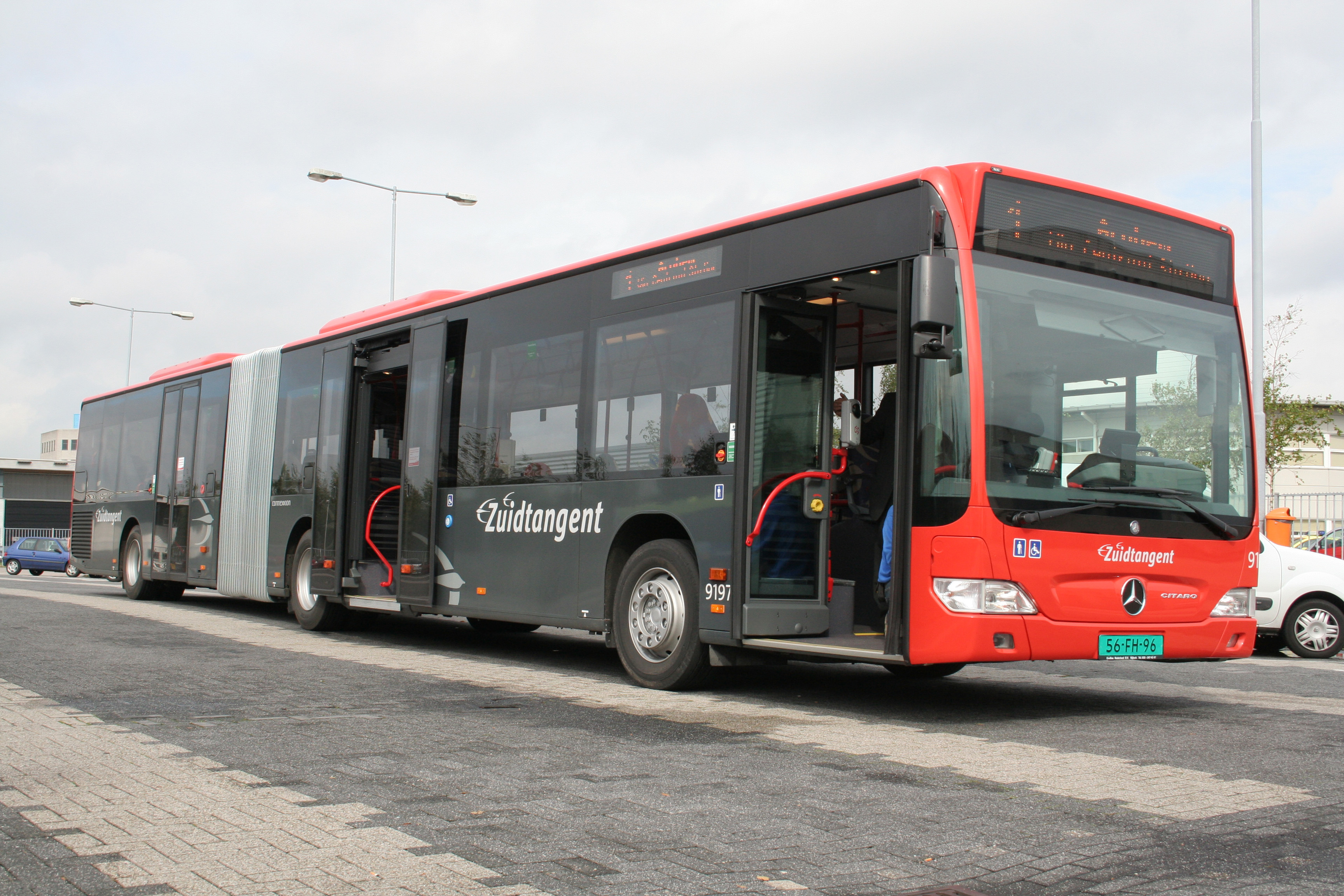
A new Citaro G for the Zuidtangent, intended as a replacement for the original fleet

Zuidtangent (Dutch for "south tangent") is the former name of the bus rapid transit service between Haarlem, Hoofddorp, and Amsterdam in the Netherlands. The Zuidtangent has been established in 2002 and was rebranded as R-net (Randstad-net) in 2011 when it became part of its eponymous regional service. Across the entire R-net network vehicles will be painted into the original Zuidtangent colour palette of dark grey and red.

The two lines that formed the Zuidtangent network have been adopted by R-net without change and are still operated by Connexxion:

- Line 300 from Haarlem via Hoofddorp, Schiphol Airport and Amstelveen to Amsterdam-Zuidoost.
- Line 397 from Nieuw-Vennep via Hoofddorp and Schiphol Airport to Amsterdam City Centre.

The Zuidtangent buses run on dedicated bus lanes from Haarlem to Schiphol Airport (25 km; line 300) and from Nieuw-Vennep to Hoofddorp (5 km; line 397). They use normal roads and motorways for most of the route between Schiphol Airport and Amsterdam-Zuidoost. They have priority at road crossings throughout. The province of North Holland has announced an extension from Hoofddorp (Beukenhorst) to Uithoorn. An extension from Haarlem to IJmuiden is established as night bus service.

Buses such as the earlier mentioned 397 and 341 operated by Connexion from Hoofddorp Spaarne Gasthuis to Amsterdam South Railway Station also use a dedicated bus road parallel to the A4 motorway between Schiphol and Osdorp.
