= Nieuw-Vennep railway station =

Railway station in the Netherlands

Nieuw-Vennep
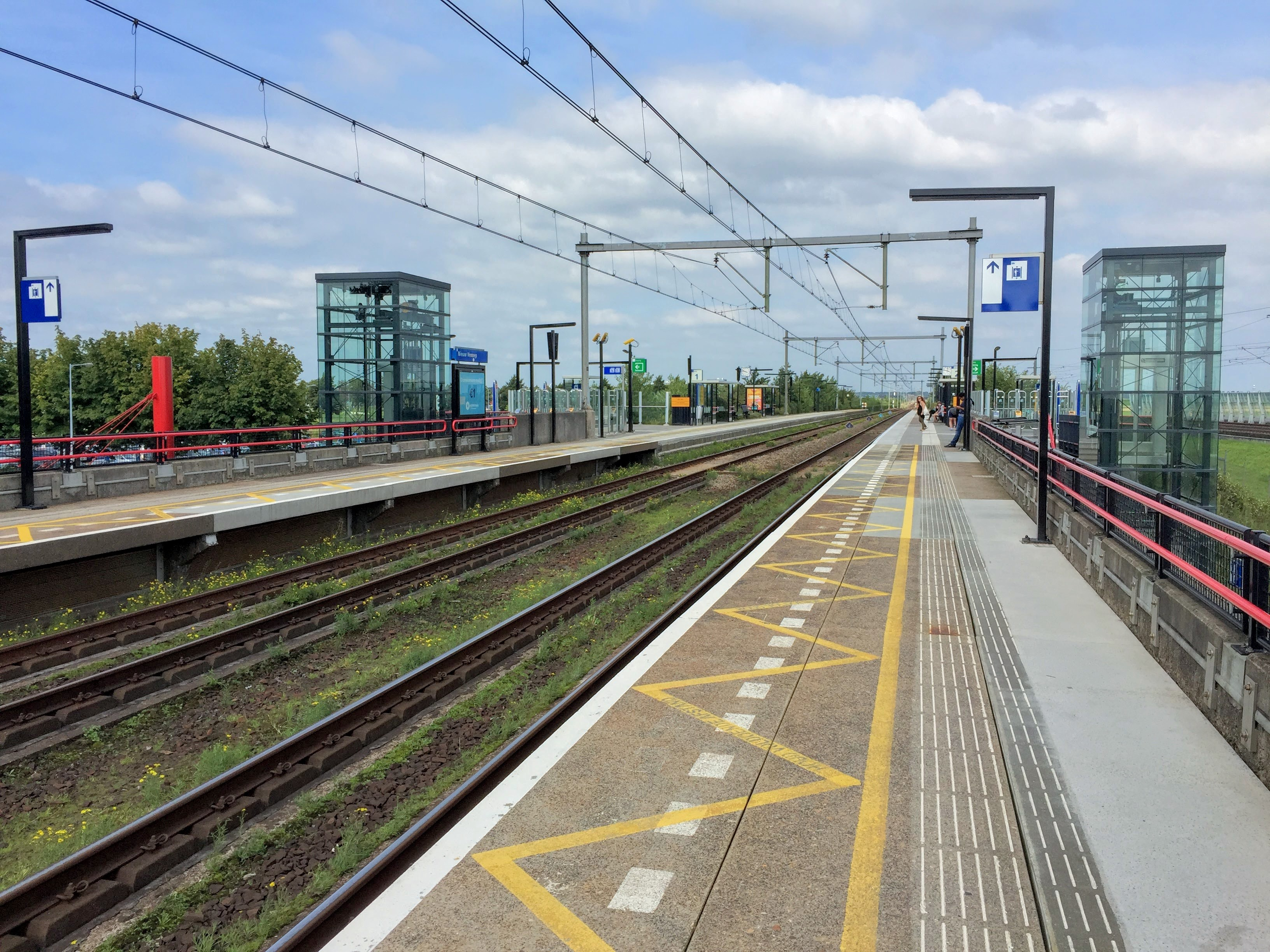

General information
- Location: Netherlands
- Coordinates: 52°15′35″N 4°38′44″E
- Operator: Nederlandse Spoorwegen
- Line: Weesp–Leiden railway

Other information
- Station code: Nvp

History
- Opened: 1912, reopened 1981
- Closed: 1936

Services
Preceding station	Nederlandse Spoorwegen	Following station
Sassenheim towards Den Haag Centraal	NS Sprinter 4300	Hoofddorp towards Lelystad Centrum
Sassenheim towards Leiden Centraal	NS Sprinter 5700 Weekdays before 20:30	Hoofddorp towards Utrecht Centraal
Location
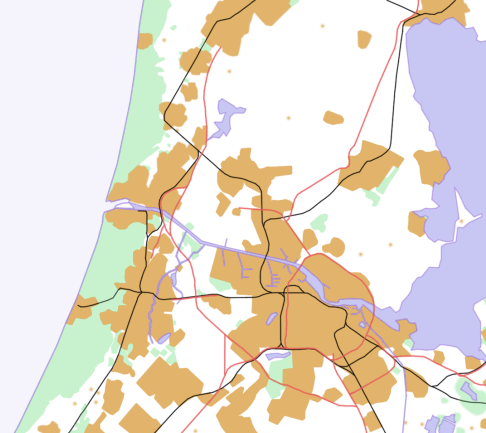
- Location within Northern Randstad Location within Netherlands

Nieuw-Vennep is a railway station in Nieuw-Vennep, Netherlands located on the Weesp–Leiden railway. It the second station in Nieuw Vennep; there existed an earlier one on the Hoofddorp–Leiden railway (commonly referred to as the Haarlemmermeerspoorlijn; from Aalsmeer to Haarlem, via Hoofddorp and Leiden). This station opened in 1912 and closed in 1936.

The current station is serviced by regional trains and opened on 31 May 1981. It is operated by the Nederlandse Spoorwegen.

== Train service ==
As of August 2017, the following train services call at this station:

- 4x per hour local Sprinter service between Leiden, Schiphol Airport, Amsterdam, Zaandam, and Hoorn
- 4x per hour local Sprinter service between The Hague, Leiden, Schiphol Airport, Amsterdam, Almere, Lelystad, and Zwolle

== Bus services ==
- 90 from Nieuw-Vennep to Hillegom, Noordwijkerhout, Noordwijk, Katwijk, Wassenaar, and Den Haag Centraal
- 92 from Hillegom to Beinsdorp, and Nieuw-Vennep
- 162 from Hoofddorp to Nieuw-Vennep, and Lisse
- 164 from Sassenheim to Abbenes, Nieuw-Vennep, and Hoofddorp
