= Hoofddorp =

- Town
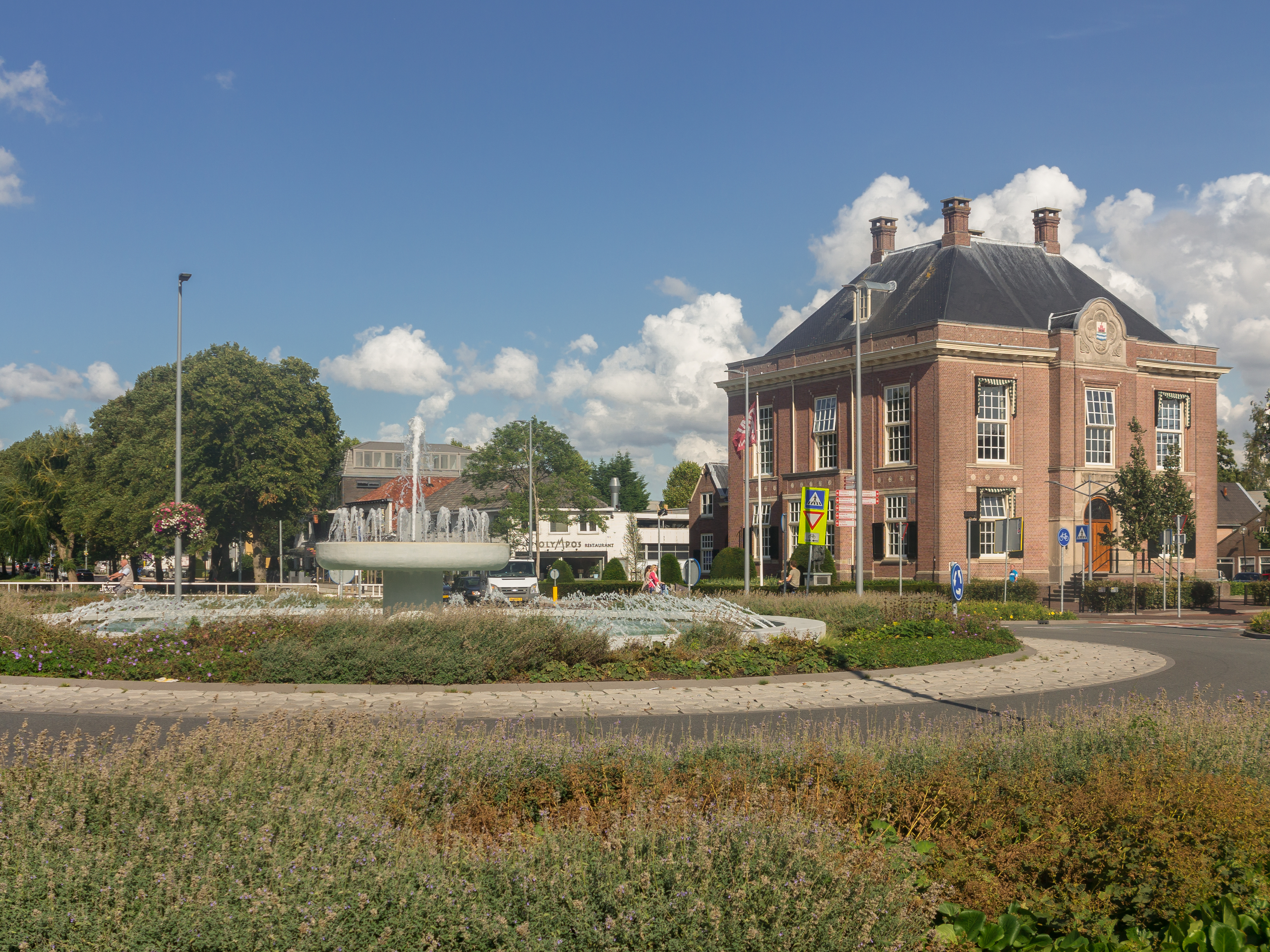
- Polderhuis: seat of the regional water board

- Location in the Netherlands Location in the province of North Holland in the Netherlands
- Coordinates: 52°18′21.96″N 4°41′26.52″E
- Country: Netherlands
- Province: North Holland
- Municipality: Haarlemmermeer

Area
  - Total: 37.85 km^{2} (14.61 sq mi)
- Elevation: −4.2 m (−14 ft)

Population (2021)
  - Total: 77,885
  - Density: 2,058/km^{2} (5,329/sq mi)
- Time zone: UTC+1 (CET)
  - Summer (DST): UTC+2 (CEST)
- Postal code: 2130–2135
- Dialing code: 023

Hoofddorp (Dutch pronunciation: [ˈɦoːvdɔr(ə)p]; lit. 'Main Village') is the main town of the municipality of Haarlemmermeer, in the province of North Holland, the Netherlands. In 2021, the population was 77,885. The town was founded in 1853, immediately after the Haarlemmermeer had been drained.

== History ==
After the draining of the Haarlemmermeer, two villages, Kruisdorp (Crossvillage) and Venneperdorp (Vennepervillage), were founded in the centre of the polder. In 1868, they were renamed to Hoofddorp, as there already was another Kruisdorp in Zeeland, and Nieuw-Vennep respectively. Hoofddorp became more prosperous than Nieuw-Vennep, and it rapidly became the most important place of the district.

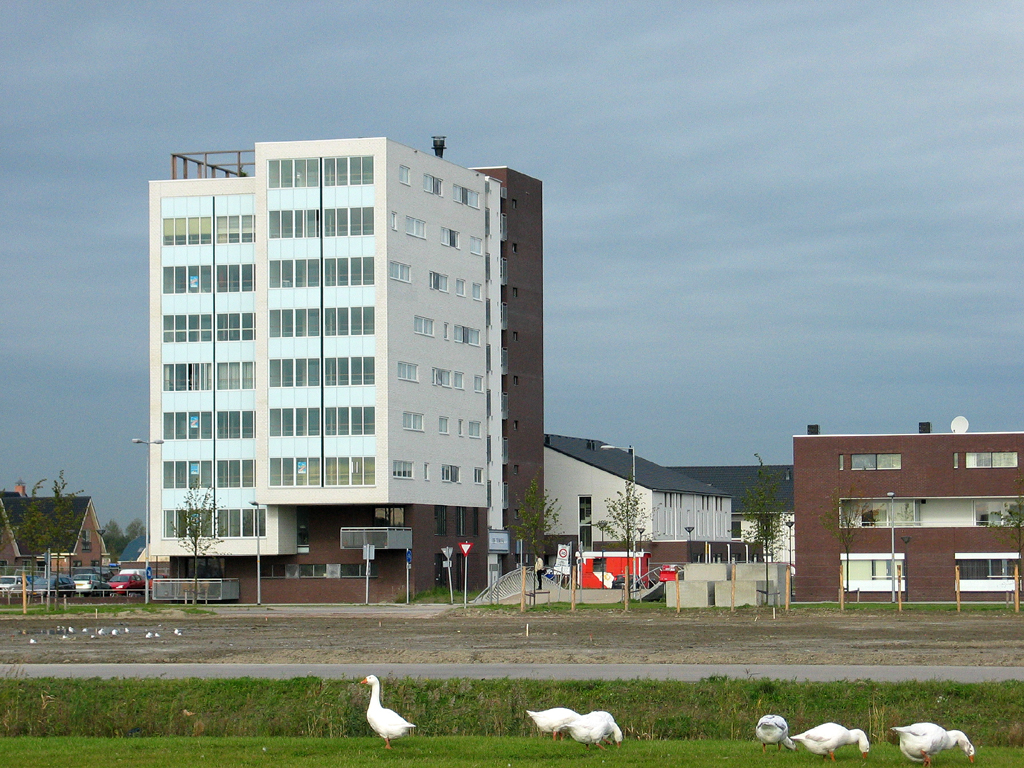
Floriande

== Landmarks ==
Hoofddorp is a relatively young town and therefore has few historical buildings. In 2008, Hoofddorp had 26 municipal, provincial and national monuments.

In the late nineteenth century Hoofddorp was included in the Defense Line of Amsterdam. A fort was built next to the main canal, two batteries were located in what are now the outskirts of Hoofddorp, and several casemates were built to the east of Hoofddorp. A large dike known as the Geniedijk (Engineers' dike) connected the fort at Hoofddorp to the batteries and the casemates, and ultimately to the fort at Vijfhuizen in the west and the fort at Aalsmeer in the east.

Hoofddorp has nine national monuments. The mill De Eersteling on the Hoofdweg is a round corn mill from 1856 and was built in the centre of Hoofddorp by Dirk David van Dijk. It was called "De Eersteling" (literally translatedThe First). Due to increased building around the mill it eventually fell into disuse.. It was originally located on the Kruisweg in the old centre of Hoofddorp, but was moved in its entirety by trailer in 1977 and is now located near Fort Hoofddorp. It has operated regularly from that time and is now open to the public.

The Witte Boerderij on the Hoofdweg is a kop-rompboerderij from 1860 and is a good example of a Haarlemmermeer farm from the early days of the polder. The Witte Boerderij is now home to the Stichting Meer-Historie.

Other monuments include the Old Town Hall from 1867, the District Court from 1911 and the Polderhuis of the Haarlemmermeer from 1913. The latter was built to a design by architect Foeke Kuipers in a historicizing architectural style that harks back to 17th-century Dutch classicism. Another monument is Marktzicht, formerly the center of Hoofddorp's market activities.

The Geniedijk runs through Hoofddorp, part of the Defense Line of Amsterdam. This defense line is on the World Heritage List of UNESCO. Fort Hoofddorp is located in that dike.

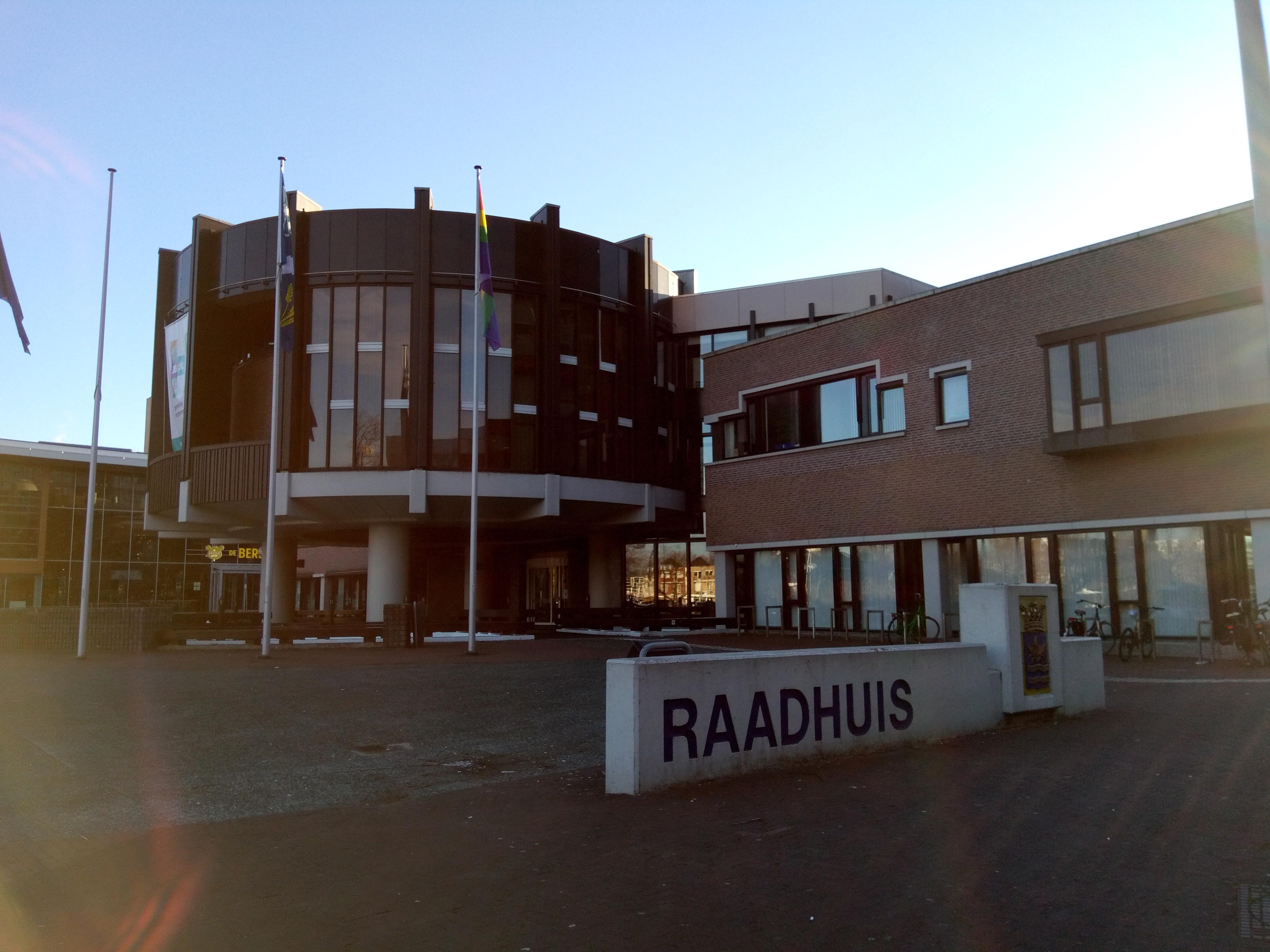
The now demolished town hall of the Haarlemmermeer municipality in Hoofddorp

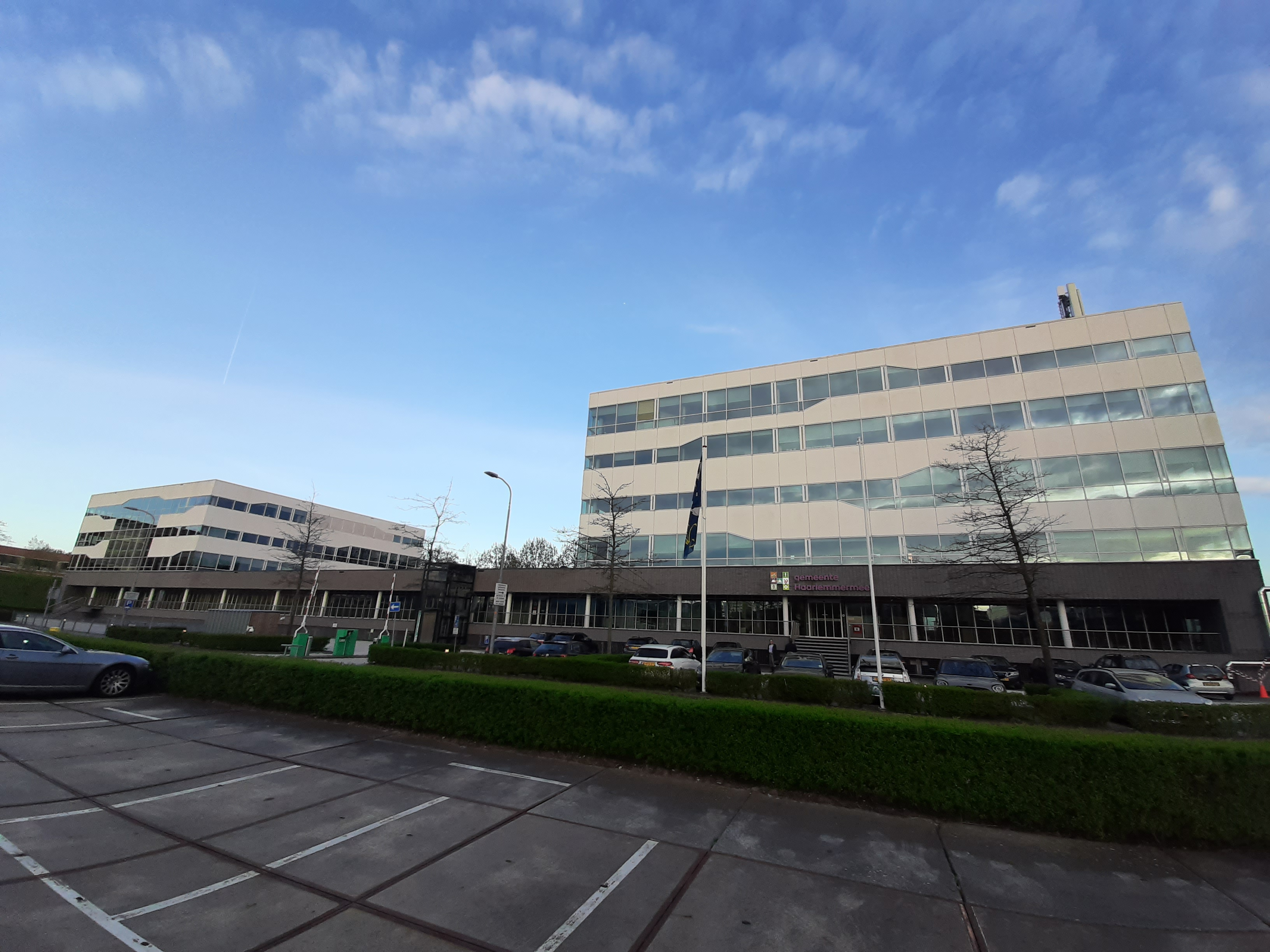
The temporary town hall of the Haarlemmermeer municipality located on Taurusavenue

=== Historical Museum ===
The Historical Museum Haarlemmermeer can be found on the Bosweg (ex-Kruisweg). The museum has all sorts of things to find about the history of the Haarlemmermeer. Among other things, it has objects related to the draining. The museum is located in part of the old Mentzhoeve farm. This farm from 1860 resembles a Limburg farm in the sense that all the buildings were built around a courtyard. The Mentzhoeve is the only farm of this type in the Haarlemmermeer.

== Transport ==
The town is served by Hoofddorp railway station. In the 2020 timetable there are 4 trains an hour to Leiden (weekdays), 4 trains an hour to Amsterdam Zuid railway station, 2 trains an hour to Zaandam, and 4 trains an hour to Amsterdam Centraal. Journey times to Amsterdam Centraal are 25 – 30 minutes.

On 3 August 1912, Hoofddorp was connected by rail to Leiden, Aalsmeer and Haarlem. These railway lines, operated by the Hollandsche Electrische-Spoorweg-Maatschappij (HESM), were closed on 31 December 1935.

In 1981, Hoofddorp was connected by rail for the second time, this time to Leiden and Schiphol Airport as a part of the Schiphollijn. The Southern High-Speed Line, that opened in 2007, will use existing conventional track from Amsterdam Central Station to Hoofddorp, where it will branch off onto a dedicated track. The trains will not stop at Hoofddorp.

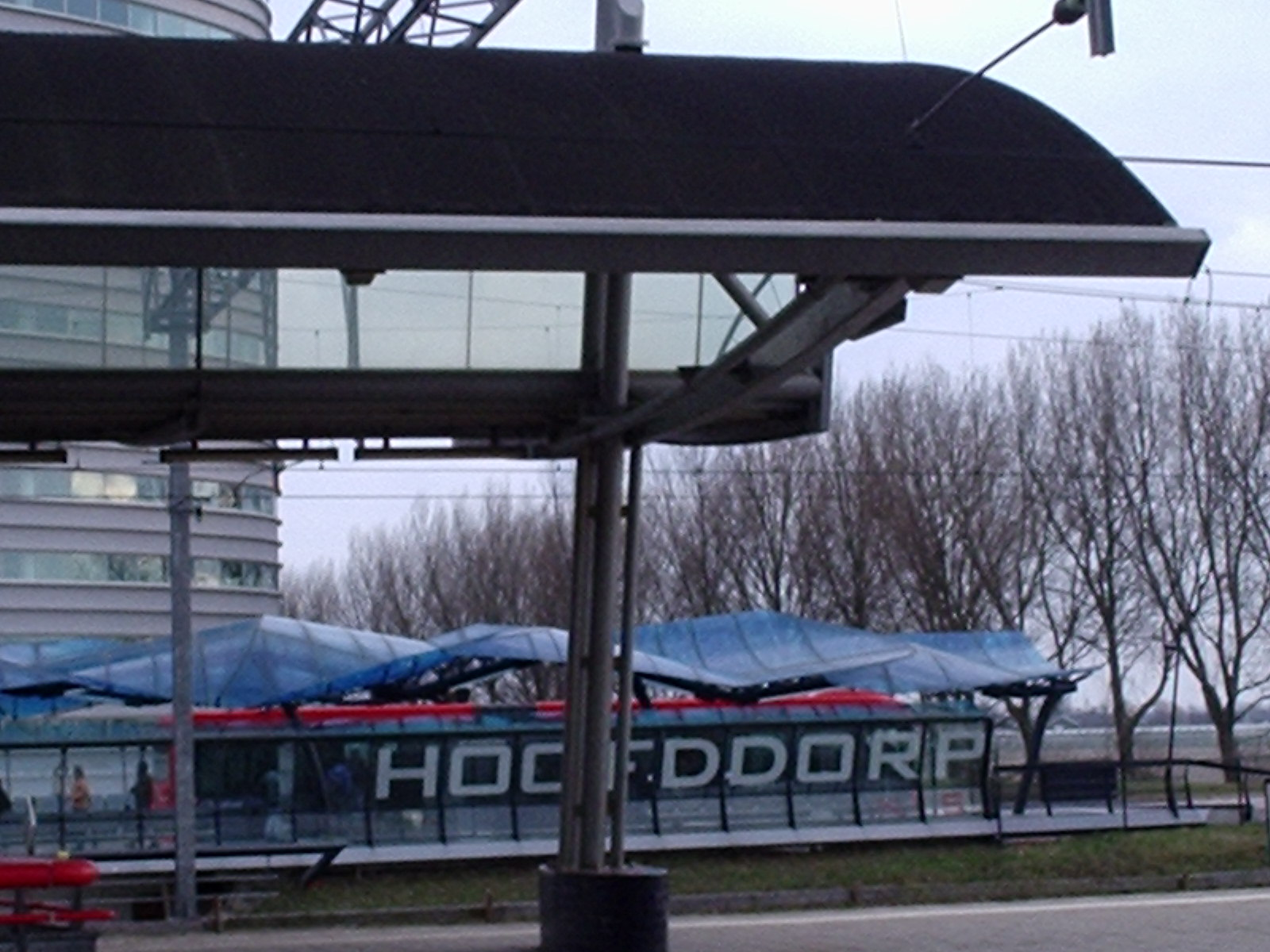
The train station and a bus station from the special bus line from Haarlem to Amsterdam, the Zuidtangent, which has largely its own bus lane, with priority at crossings. In the background, the row of trees can be seen that is planted along the Geniedijk

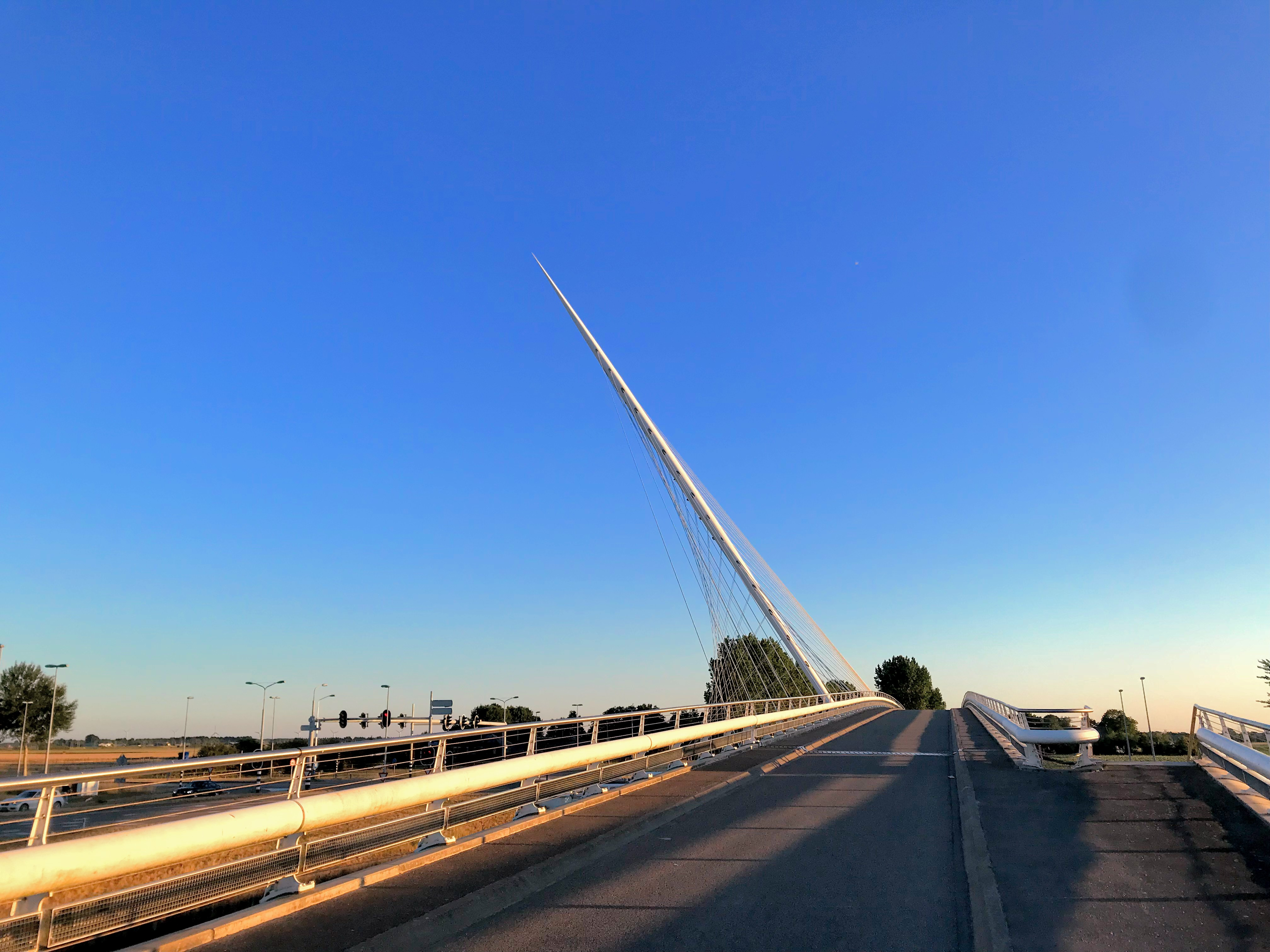
A Calatrava bridge between Hoofddorp and Nieuw-Vennep

On 30 November 1992, the Hoofddorp train disaster took place near Hoofddorp, causing 5 deaths and 33 wounded.

Hoofddorp is connected by many bus lines to many cities and towns in the immediate surroundings. Most bus lines are operated by Connexxion. In 2002, Hoofddorp was connected to Haarlem, Schiphol Airport and Amsterdam Zuidoost by the high quality bus line Zuidtangent. In 2009 came the Second line from Amsterdam Zuid railway station to Nieuw Vennep Getsewoud. The Zuidtangent will be expanded by adding a line to Uithoorn and Amsterdam IJburg.

The bus station at Spaarne Hospital in Hoofddorp is the world's biggest structure built entirely from synthetic materials: factory-cut polystyrene foam with a polyester skin. At this moment it has been painted in a sort of orange colour. However, the municipality has decided to remove the structure because of high maintenance costs.

In January 2019, CEO of Amsterdam Airport Schiphol Dick Benschop announced that agreements had been reached to extend the Amsterdam Metro's North-South line to the airport and Hoofddorp.

== Government and infrastructure ==
The Netherlands Aviation Safety Board, during its existence, had its head office in Hoofddorp. The Dutch Transport Safety Board, the successor agency, was established on 1 July 1999 and the Netherlands Aviation Safety Board was merged into the agency at that time.

== Private transport ==
Hoofddorp is well connected to several of the main roads in the Netherlands. At Knooppunt De Hoek, the A5 motorway branches off to Haarlem from the A4 motorway that leads to Amsterdam and The Hague. The A9 motorway can easily be reached via Badhoevedorp or the junction of the A4 and A9 at Knooppunt Badhoevedorp.

Hoofddorp itself lies on the crossing of the two main secondary roads in Haarlemmermeer: the N201 from Hilversum to Zandvoort and the N520, that runs alongside the main canal of the Haarlemmermeer and dissects the polder from north to south. The suburb of Toolenburg is connected to an as yet to be developed industrial area by the bridge Lute, which was designed by architect Santiago Calatrava as part of a series of 3 bridges over the main canal along the N520. The secondary road N205 connects Nieuw Vennep to Haarlem and is part of the ring around Hoofddorp; the N201 also forms part of the ring.

== Sports ==
FIFPro, the association of professional football players, is located in Hoofddorp.

== Economy ==
Atlas Professionals is headquartered in Hoofddorp.

Stellantis is headquartered in Hoofddorp.

== Notable residents ==
- Fanny Blankers-Koen, four-time gold medallist at the 1948 Olympic Games in London.
- C. Joh. Kieviet, writer of children's literature.
- Tineke Netelenbos, former minister of Transport and Water Management in the second cabinet of Wim Kok.
- Marly van der Velden, actress from the soap Goede tijden, slechte tijden.
- Khalid Boulahrouz, former professional footballer.
- Fajah Lourens, actress from the former soap Goede tijden, slechte tijden.
- Rinus van Kalmthout, racing driver active in the IndyCar Series in North America where he is known as Rinus VeeKay.
- Rianne Van Rompaey, top model, was born in Hoofddorp.
- Lucas Cornelis van Scheppingen, DJ, Record Producer, born in Manila, Philippines, Raised in Hoofddorp owner of Mixmash Records.
- Myron van Brederode, a Dutch professional footballer currently playing for AZ Alkmaar
- Déron Payne, a Trinidadian professional footballer currently playing for FC Volendam
