= De Vennip =

Former municipality in the Netherlands

Coordinates: 52.268367°N 4.629021°E

De Vennip is a former municipality in the Netherlands, which at the time belonged to the province of South Holland. It consisted of a small area of land east of Hillegom, and a large part of the Haarlemmermeer lake, including the island of Beinsdorp (which is now the name of a village in the Haarlemmermeer polder). The area of the municipality was 38.61 km^{2}, of which only 1.18 km^{2} was land.

According to the 19th-century historian A.J. van der Aa, De Vennip used to be a manor, and was first mentioned in 1334. The land area of the manor was much larger then, but when the Haarlemmermeer grew, De Vennip became smaller.

From 1812 until 1817, the area was part of the municipality Hillegom, but it became a separate municipality in 1817, even though there were no inhabitants. In 1855, it merged again with Hillegom. In 1855, the water area had been drained and the new land became part of the new municipality of Haarlemmermeer, which became part of the province of North Holland.

The municipality gave its name to the village of Nieuw-Vennep.
