= Charity Guide =

US non-profit organization

- Founded: 2000
- Founder: Michael Organ
- Dissolved: 2015; 11 years ago
- Tax ID no.: 20-3535535
- Legal status: 501(c)(3) nonprofit organization
- Headquarters: Wilmette, Illinois, United States
- Chairman of the Board: Diane MacWilliams
- President: Michael Organ
- Revenue: $342 (2014)
- Expenses: $5,482 (2014)
- Website: www.charityguide.org

Charity Guide was a tax-exempt, nonprofit 501(c)(3) organization in the United States dedicated to inspiring and facilitating volunteer opportunities through an approach known as flexible volunteerism. Its website, VolunteerGuide.org, offered a list of volunteer opportunities, service projects and volunteer vacation ideas designed to be entirely flexible and immediately actionable by would-be volunteers. Charity Guide was based in Wilmette, Illinois

== Approach ==
Based on the premise that many would-be volunteers have hectic and unpredictable schedules, making it difficult for them to commit to traditional, regular volunteer schedules, Charity Guide focused on listing flexible volunteer opportunities through which people can help a cause of their choosing in as little as 15 minutes. Also known as “Volunteering On-Demand,” the approach sought to give busy people a way to help a cause any time, from anywhere, without having to commit to a schedule or register in advance.

== Volunteer opportunities ==
VolunteerGuide.org listed volunteer opportunities, service projects and volunteer vacations in six areas, including animal welfare, helping children, community development, environmental protection, health and safety and poverty/homelessness. Service projects include paid listings as part of VolunteerGuide.org's corporate citizenship program.

== History ==
Charity Guide was founded in 2000 by internet marketing and advertising consultant, Michael Organ, who served as executive director. Charity Guide ceased operations in 2015, linking instead to VolunteerMatch.org
