= Nieuw-Vennep =

Nieuw Vennep
- Town
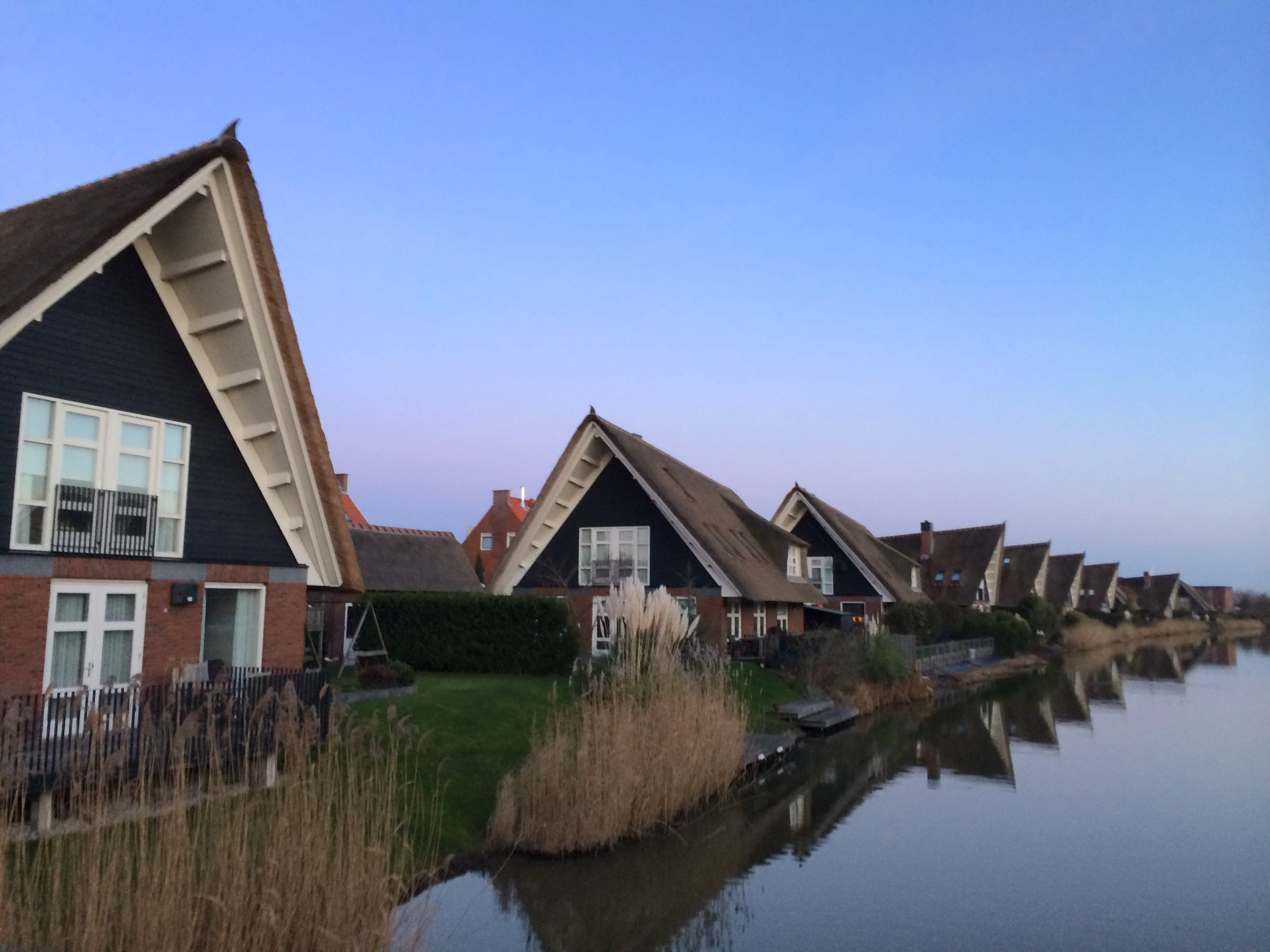
- Getsewoud neighbourhood in Nieuw-Vennep

- Flag

- Location in the Netherlands Location in the province of North Holland in the Netherlands
- Coordinates: 52°15′52″N 4°38′05″E
- Country: Netherlands
- Province: North Holland
- Municipality: Haarlemmermeer

Area
  - Total: 34.20 km^{2} (13.20 sq mi)
- Elevation: −3.8 m (−12 ft)

Population (2021)
  - Total: 31,415
  - Density: 918.6/km^{2} (2,379/sq mi)
- Time zone: UTC+1 (CET)
  - Summer (DST): UTC+2 (CEST)
- Postal code: 2150–2153
- Dialing code: 0252

Nieuw-Vennep is a town in the Dutch province of North Holland. It is located near the capital city Amsterdam as well as Amsterdam Airport Schiphol. It has a population of 31,415 (2021), and is a part of the municipality of Haarlemmermeer, which ranks in top 15% of Dutch municipalities by income level.

== Geography and demographics ==
Nieuw-Vennep has 31,415 inhabitants (2021). The town has two districts, the Old Town and the newly built Getsewoud, with each being home to around half the town's population.

In 2001, before the development of Getsewoud, Nieuw-Vennep had 17,886 inhabitants. The development of Getsewoud doubled the number of homes in the town and the population followed soon after.

The built-up area of the town was 3.71 km^{2}, and contained 7,513 residences. The wider statistical area of Nieuw-Vennep has a population of around 40,000.

== History ==
Northwest of present-day Nieuw-Vennep lay the island Vennip or Vennep, to which Nieuw-Vennep owes its name, meaning "New Vennep". Nieuw-Vennep is one of two towns officially founded after the lake Haarlemmermeer was made into a dry land polder in 1852. The other town was Hoofddorp, at the time still named Kruisdorp. Until 1868 Nieuw-Vennep was called Venneperdorp, both towns have used their current name since that time.

The first inhabitants were farm laborers living under poor circumstances. As a result of the conditions, the town was nicknamed De Krim, in reference to the Crimea war fought between 1853 and 1856. As Hoofddorp became the governmental and economic center of the municipality, the development of Nieuw-Vennep lagged behind. On 2 November 1862 the construction of a new church ("De Witte Kerk") was initiated by the Dutch Reformed Church.

== Economics ==
The municipality of Haarlemmermeer, of which Nieuw-Vennep is a part, ranks in the top 15% of the country's richest municipalities by income level. Nieuw-Vennep is located close to Amsterdam, as well as the main airport of the country which provides around 65,000 jobs. Many people who work in Amsterdam or other nearby cities, have chosen to settle in Nieuw-Vennep for its peacefulness and family-friendly facilities.

However, during the COVID-19 pandemic of 2020, it was also one of the economically hardest-hit regions, with its GDP shrinking 28% as the nearby airport Schiphol suffered a big blow.

== Transport ==
Besides several bus lines going in and out, there is also the Railway station Nieuw-Vennep, which includes a 10-minute train ride to Schiphol, a 30 min ride to Amsterdam Central station, and other destinations.

== Trivia ==
- The town of Nieuw-Vennep is mentioned at the beginning of the Ash song "Jack Names the Planets".

== Notable people from Nieuw Vennep ==
- Mitchell Donald (1988) a Surinamese professional footballer who previously played for AFC Ajax
- Calvin Stengs (1998) a Dutch professional footballer who is currently playing for Feyenoord
- Tim van de Loo (2003) a Dutch professional footballer who is currently playing for RKC Waalwijk

== Photo gallery ==
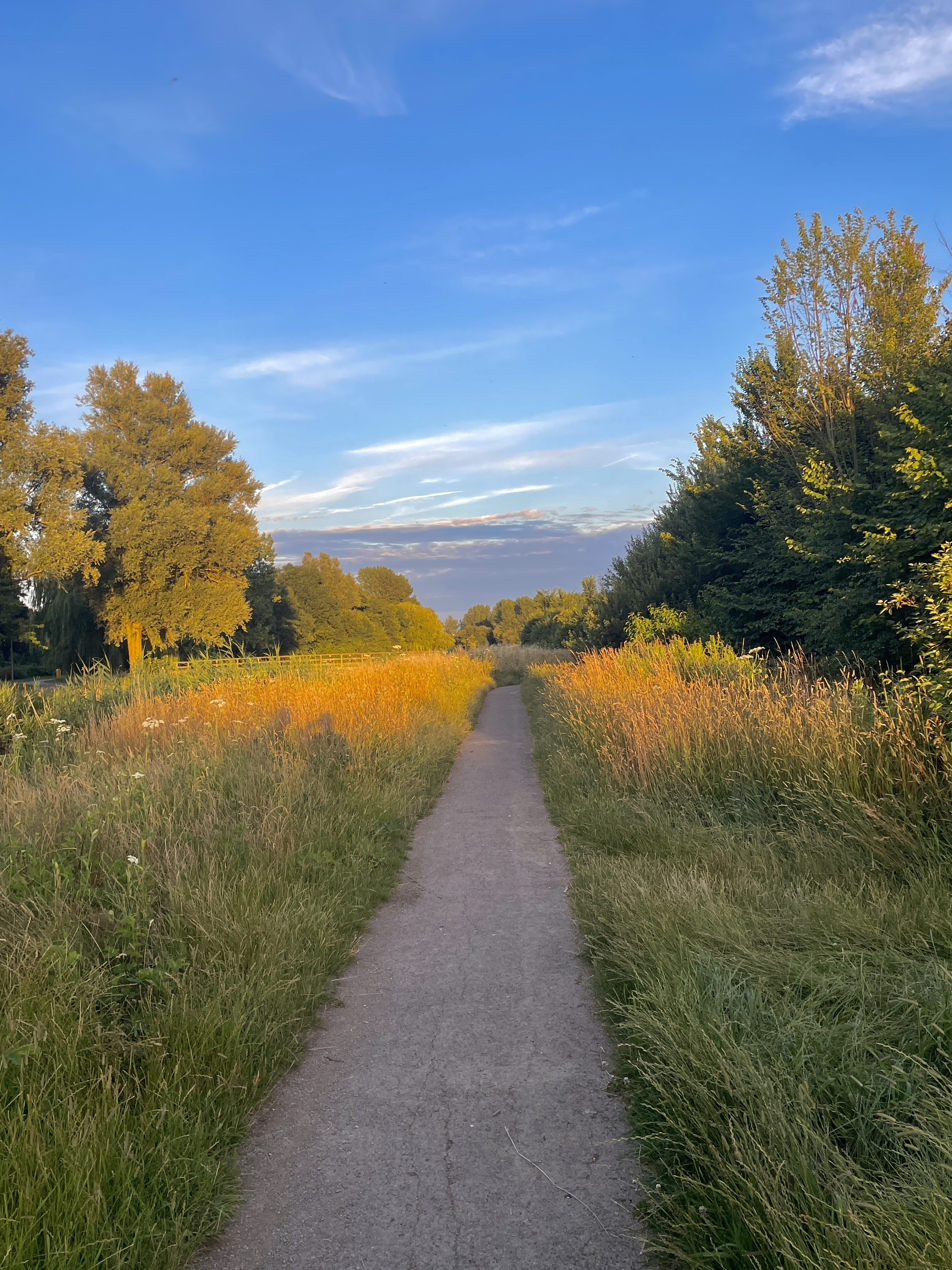
Venneperhout Park

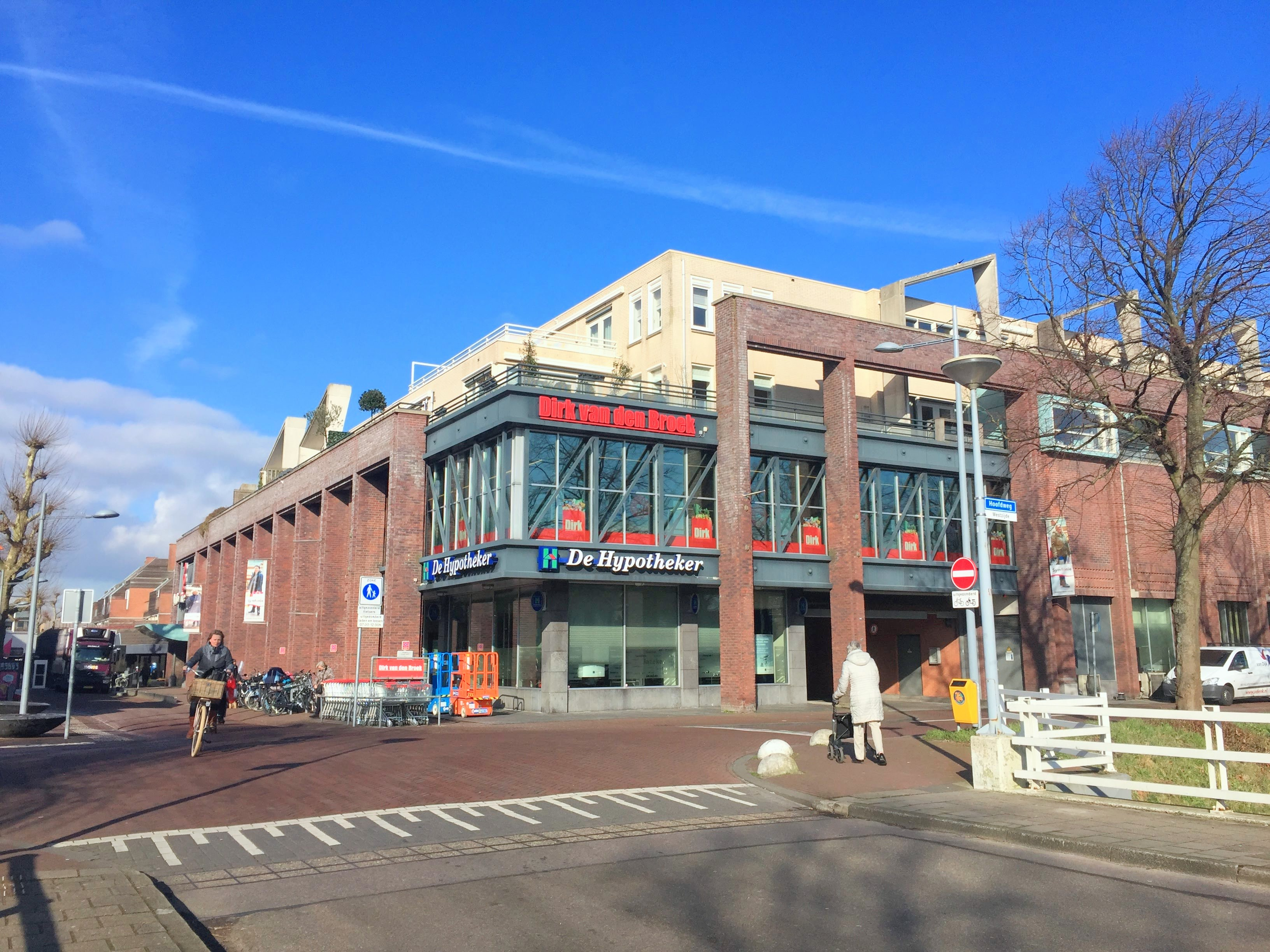
Shoppingmall De Symfonie

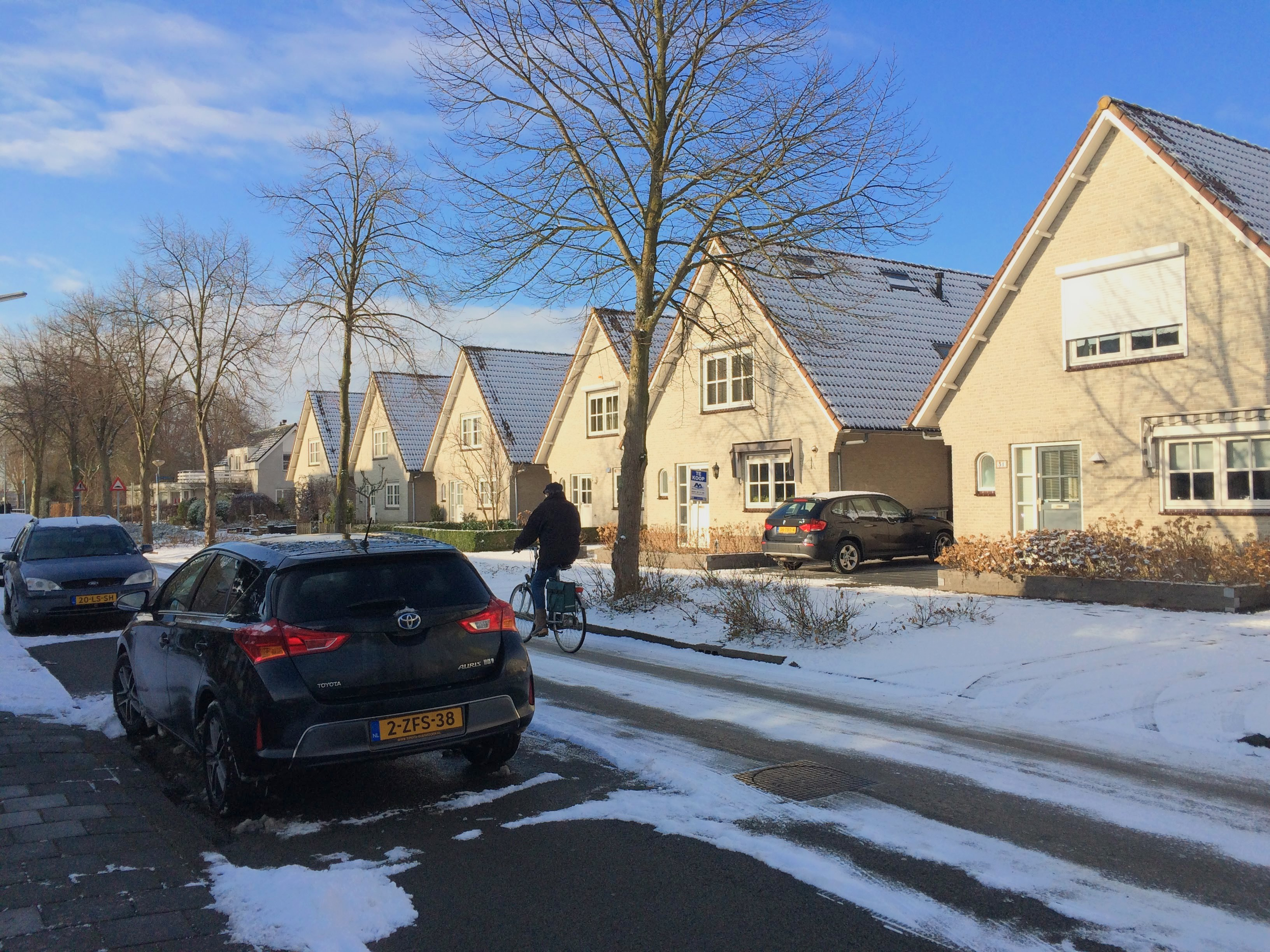
A snowy Dotterbloemstreet

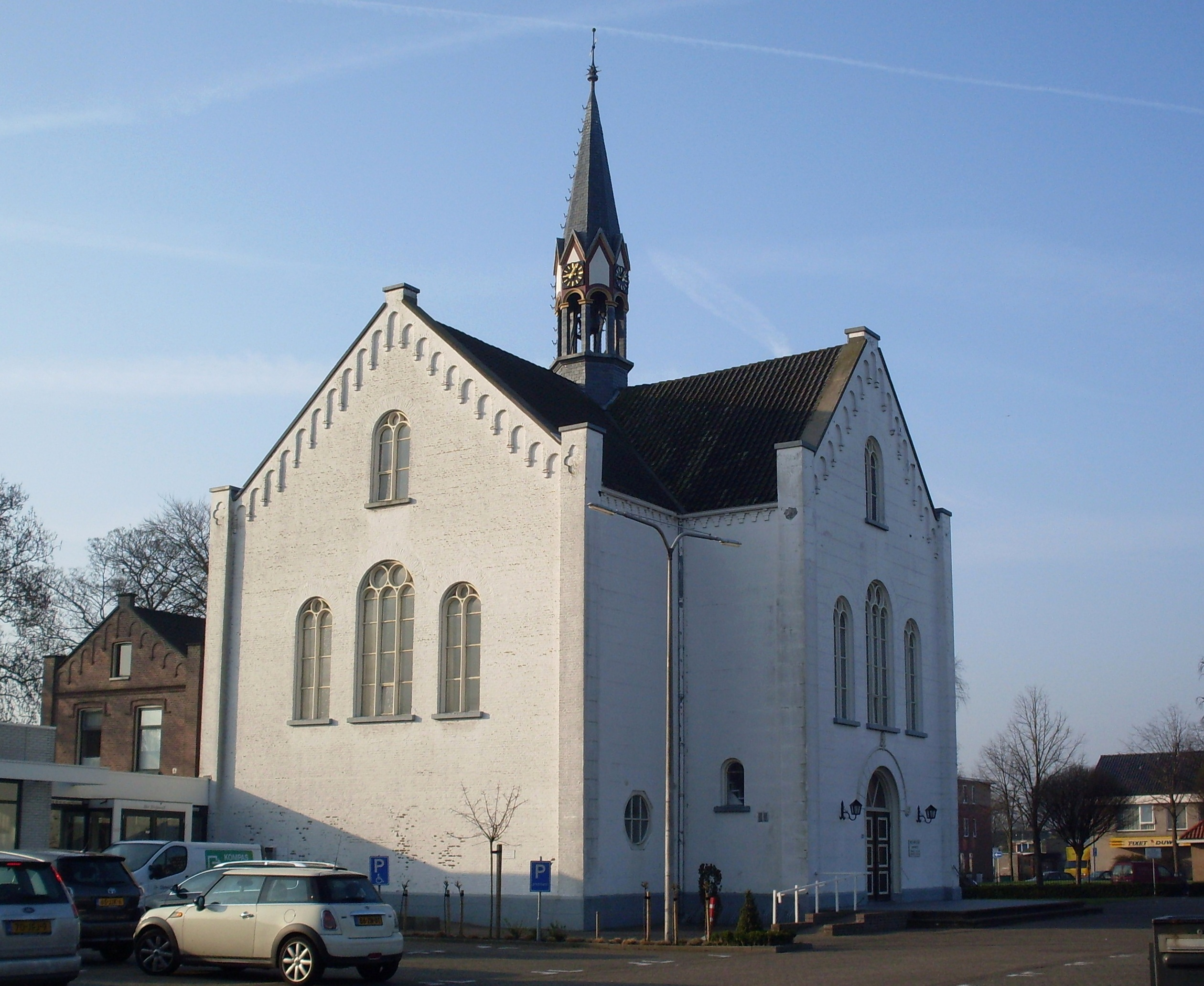
Church De Witte Kerk

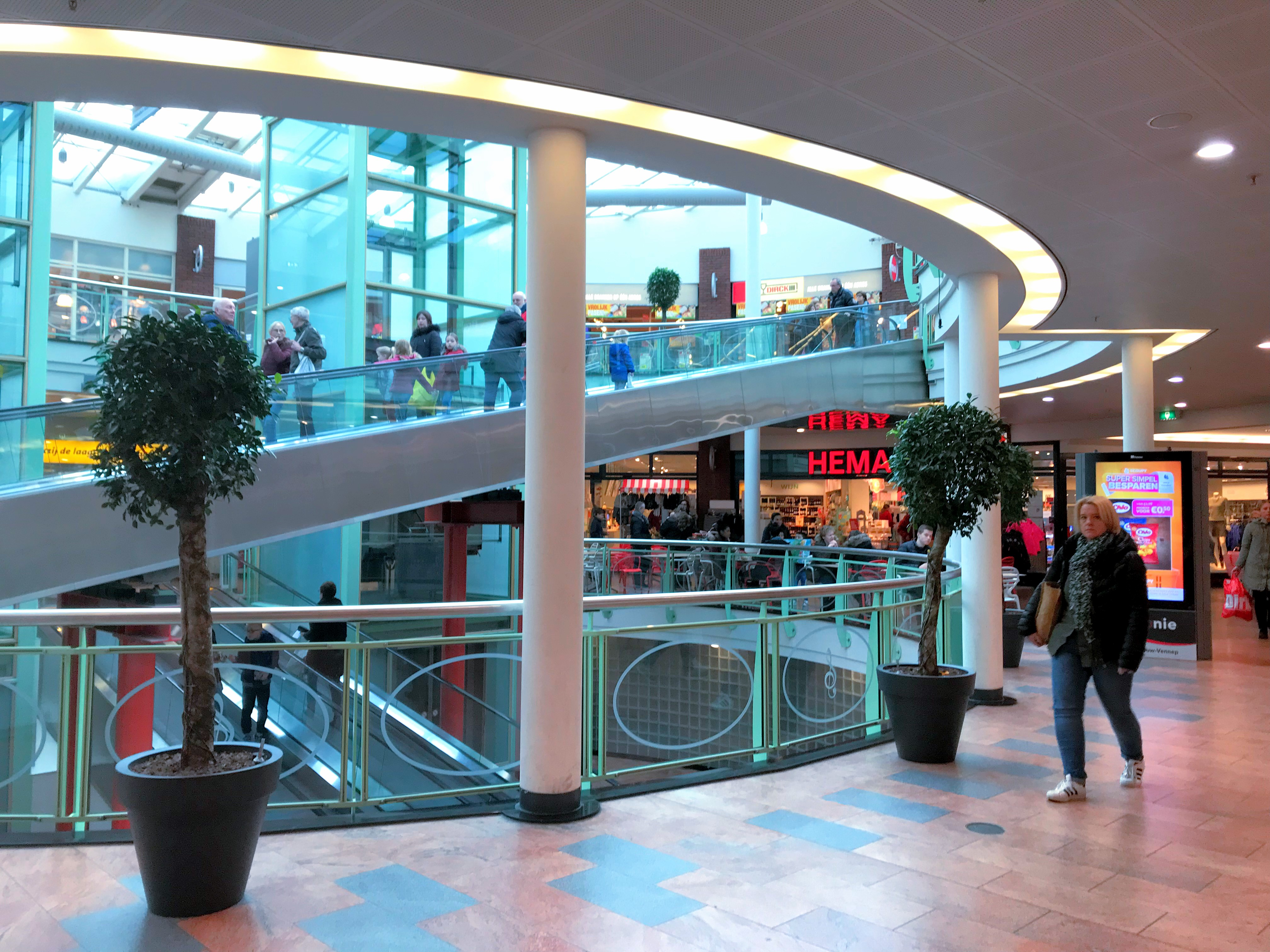
Inside the Symfonie shopping mall
