= Weesp–Leiden railway =

Railway line in the Netherlands

Schiphollijn
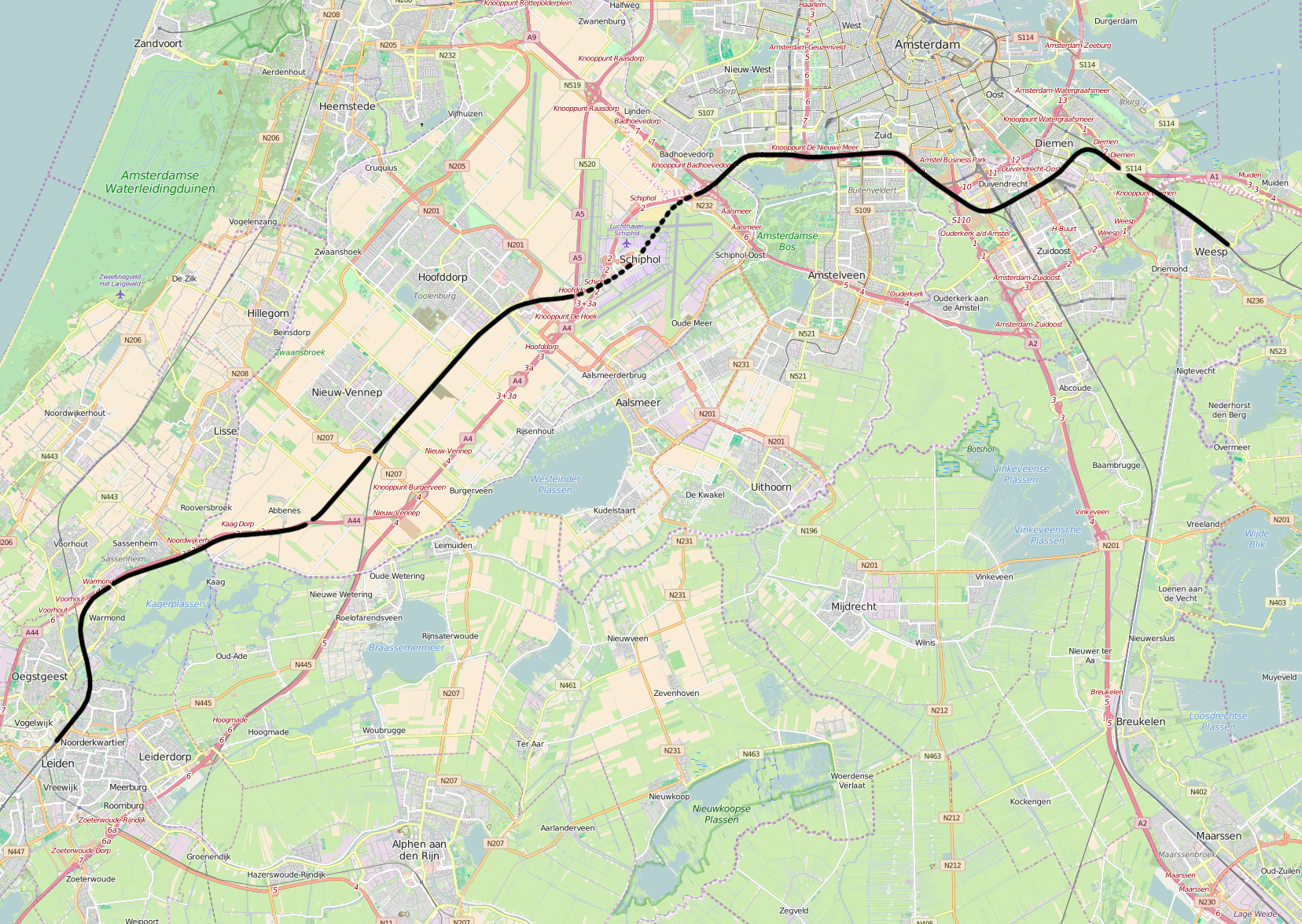

Overview
- Owner: ProRail
- Locale: Netherlands
- Termini: Weesp; Leiden Centraal
- Stations: 9

Service
- Type: Heavy rail
- System: Nederlandse Spoorwegen
- Operator(s): Nederlandse Spoorwegen

History
- Opened: 1978

Technical
- Track length: 30 kilometres (19 mi)
- Track gauge: 1,435 mm (4 ft 8 1/2 in)

The Weesp–Leiden railway (Dutch: Schiphollijn) is a railway line in the Netherlands which runs between the cities of Weesp and Leiden; the line also passes through and serves Amsterdam Airport Schiphol.

== History ==
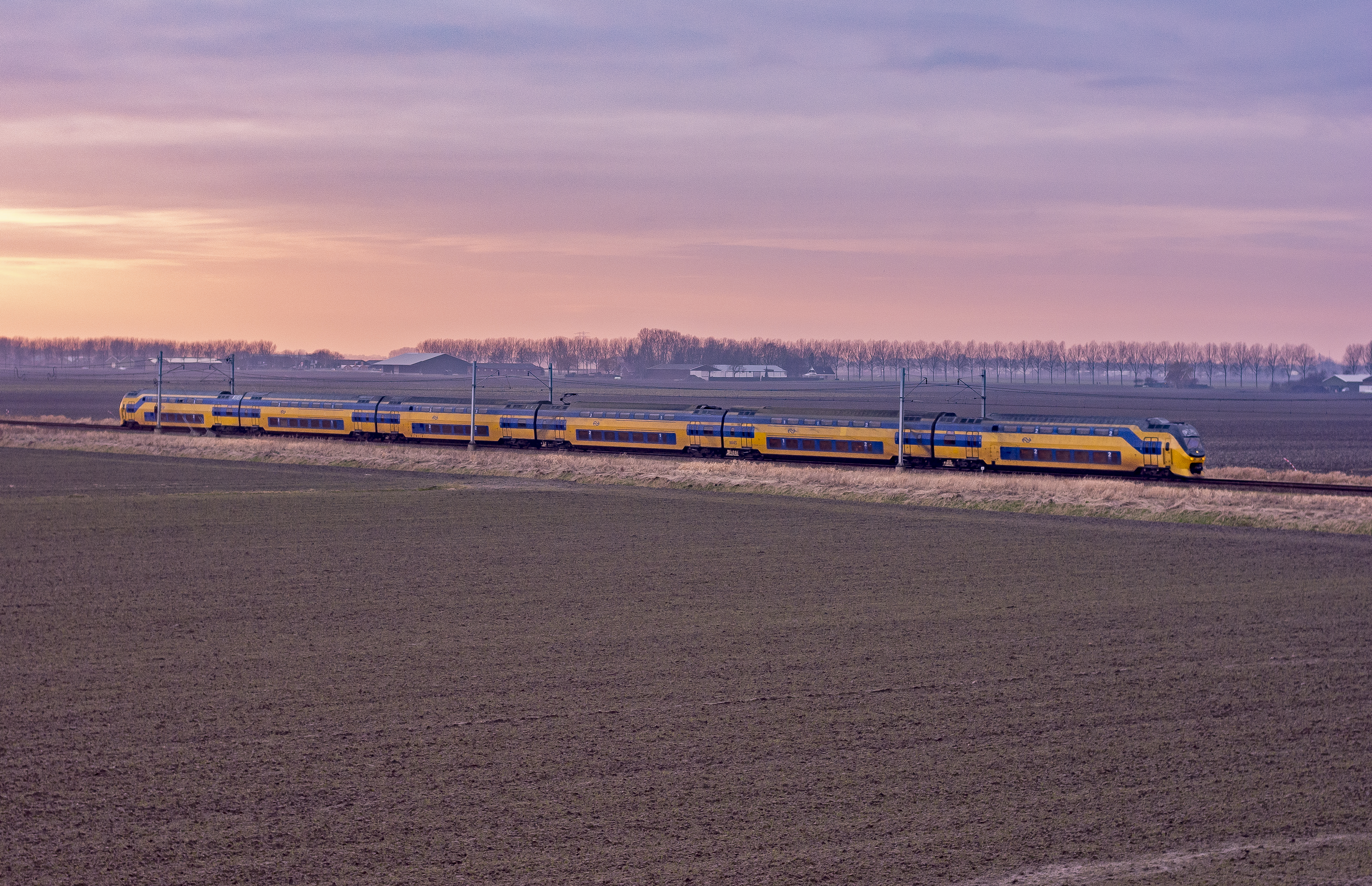
Nieuw-Vennep VIRM 8645 als IC 761 Den Haag-Groningen (32652898772)

=== Opening ===
The first section of the Schiphollijn was opened on 20 December 1978 between Schiphol and Amsterdam Zuid. At the time, this section of railway was not connected to the rest of the Dutch railway network. This section of the Schiphollijn features a 6 kilometres (3.7 mi)-long tunnel, in which Schiphol railway station is located. When it was constructed, Schiphol was the only railway station in the Netherlands to be in-tunnel.

=== Extension ===
The line was extended in both directions in 1981 to Amsterdam RAI and Leiden Centraal; new stations were opened at Hoofddorp and Nieuw-Vennep. In 1986, a connection to Amsterdam Centraal was completed: the Amsterdam–Schiphol railway. Stations were opened at Amsterdam Lelylaan, Amsterdam De Vlugtlaan and Amsterdam Sloterdijk.

Amsterdam De Vlugtlaan was closed in 2000, after the opening of the Hemboog: a chord at Amsterdam Sloterdijk which connects Schiphol Airport and the city of Zaandam. The line was completed in 1993 when the railway was extended to the town of Weesp. This enabled direct connections to Schiphol Airport from the eastern and northern provinces of the Netherlands to Schiphol. Duivendrecht station opened to provide a connection between the new line and the Amsterdam–Arnhem railway. The most important stations on the line currently are: Leiden Centraal, Hoofddorp, Schiphol airport, Amsterdam Zuid, Duivendrecht and Weesp.
