= Alpe d'HuZes =

Dutch sports event

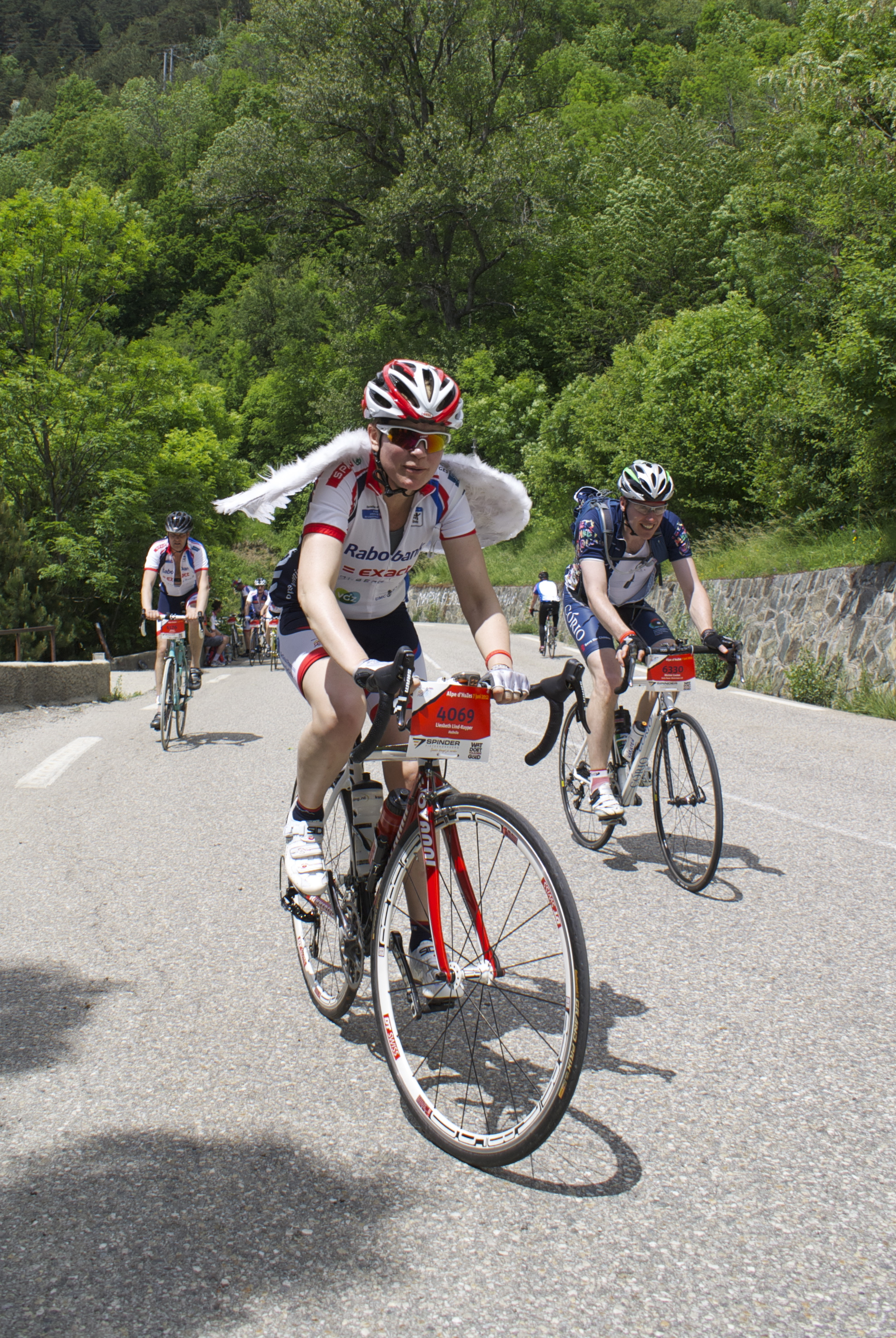
Participants in Alpe d'HuZes 2012

Alpe d'HuZes is a Dutch fundraising event for combating cancer in which people climb, typically by bike, six times in a single day. The mountain Alpe d'Huez is well-known in the Netherlands as one of the main Tour de France mountains where Dutch cyclists have been traditionally relatively successful. The event is organized by Stichting Alpe d'HuZes, whose name is a combination of the name of the mountain Alpe d'Huez and the Dutch word "zes" (six) and its motto is "opgeven is geen optie" (quitting is not an option).

During the first edition, the number six was central, as it challenged people to climb the mountain six times, on 6/6/2006 with 66 participants. In later years the number of climbs became more fluid, and while some still climb 6 times, others climb once, or more. Teams can consist of any number of people and raise money jointly.

The aim of the event is to raise money for research into cancer. The event runs on volunteers and all costs are borne by the participants themselves. The mission of Alpe d'HuZes is to raise money for cancer research so that in the future no one has to die from cancer.

Peter Kapitein, cancer survivor, co-founder and participant of the first Alpe d'HuZes event in 2006, received an honorary doctorate from the Free University of Amsterdam in October 2012 for "his exceptional merits for investigating and improving the possibilities of living with cancer."

== Alpe d'HuZes/KWF Fonds ==
Due to the rapidly increasing collected total amounts by Alpe d'HuZes, the donations through Alpe d'HuZes are managed by the Dutch Cancer Society (KWF) in a dedicated named fund: Alpe d'HuZes/KWF-fonds. This fund pays for research through the KWF grants process with a particular focus on long-term research into successful rehabilitation of cancer patients. This is based on the conclusion that there is a lot of knowledge already in what factors affect getting cancer, but much less about the factors that make patients live more or less well with the disease.

== 2013 scandals and lower donations ==
Short after the 2013 edition, the event and foundation were criticized because they hadn't been able to actually spend 37 million euro of the collected donations from the previous years and researchers complained that the process to get funding was opaque. Later that year Coen van Veenendaal, one of the founders and former member of the board, was accused of taking large sums of money from the foundation, both through high reimbursements and working for the company Inspire2Live that was subsidized by the foundation. It turned out that the subsidy of 3 million was only partially spent on scientific research, but mostly on management fees and reimbursement for travel. The board of the company announced to resign (Note: Although it was in December 2013 reported that they never actually resigned.) and his behavior was condemned by the board of Alpe d'HuZes.

The scandal played out widely in the Dutch media, and one of the most successful fundraising effort was suddenly much less appreciated. In the years after, Alpe d'HuZes and KWF strengthened its checks and balances after they were forced to admit that oversight was insufficient in the case of Inspire2Live and some other subsidies. The collected funds were much lower in the following year (13.5 million) compared to 2013 (29 million) and also the years after, the collected amounts would remain between 10 and 15 million. Also the annual direct donations drive of KWF (not through Alpe d'HuZes) raised about 15% less than usual. This was in part due to the economic crisis, as other charities raised on average 8% less - but the downturn was also attributed to the scandals.

== Editions ==
Since its first edition in 2006, Alpe d"HuZes has raised more than 150 million euros in the fight against cancer.

Editions of Alpe d'Huzes since 2006
Year	Day(s)	Participants	Amount contributed	Other notes	Reference
2006	June 6	66	€370,091.98	First edition	
2007	June 7	77 individual 9 teams	€1,043,155.11	7 climbs	
2008	June 5	100 individual 54 teams	€3.5 million	6 + 2 climbs	
2009	June 4	1300	€5.7 million	6, 7, 8 or 9 climbs	
2010	June 3	2500 individual (Note: Exact number unclear) 250 teams	€11.9 million	back to 6 climbs	
2011	June 9	4500	€20.2 million		
2012	June 6 & 7	3000 on June 6 5000 on June 7	€32.2 million		
2013	June 5 & 6	7800	€29 million		
2014	June 4 & 5	5000	€13.5 million		
2015	June 4	4693	€12 million		
2016	June 1 & 2	4500	€11.1 million		
2017	June 1	4000	€10.4 million	Event was partially canceled due to weather	
2018	June 6 & 7		€11.3 million		
2019			€11.9 million		
2020			€7.2 million	Event cancelled due to COVID-19	
2021			€1.5 million	Event cancelled due to COVID-19	
2022			€7.9 million		
