= List of helicopter airlines =

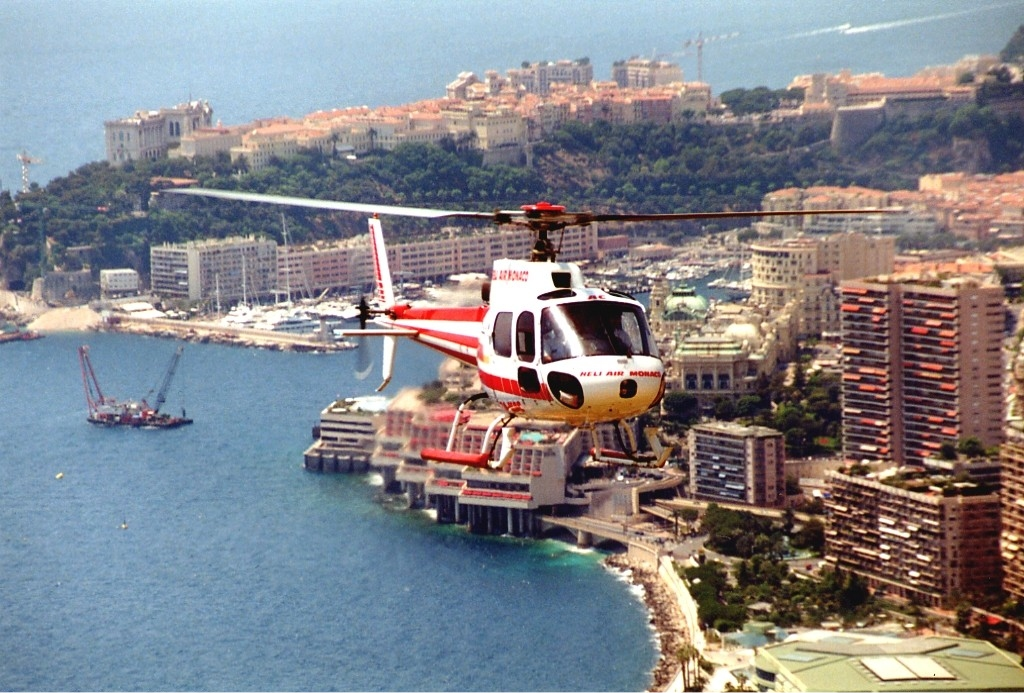
A Eurocopter AS350 of Heli Air Monaco flying over the Vista Palace Hotel in Monte Carlo

This is a list of helicopter airlines. These are notable airlines which provide transport for passengers or cargo, or both, with fleets that comprise a significant proportion of helicopters.

== Helicopter airlines ==
=== In operation ===
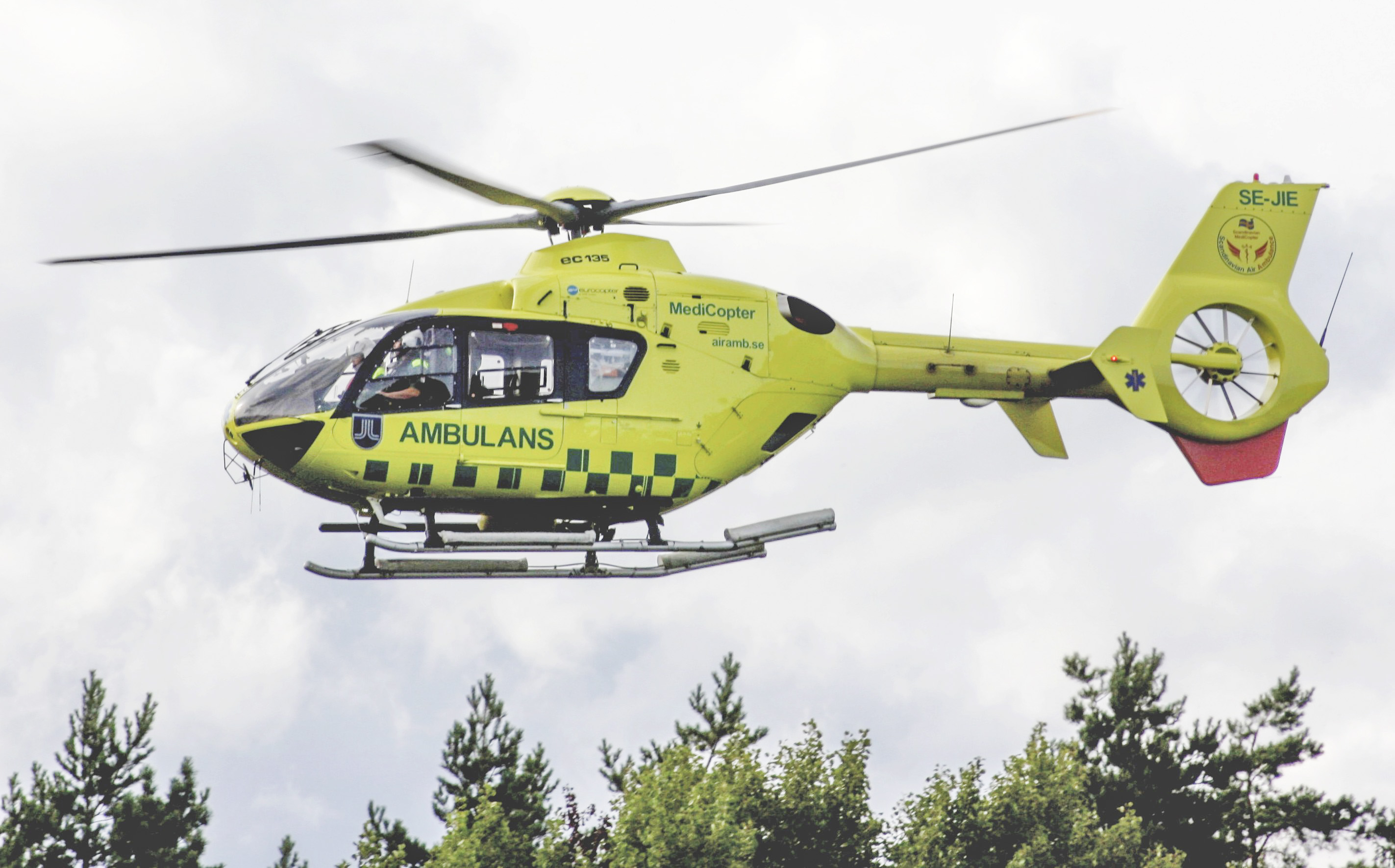
A Scandinavian AirAmbulance EC135 helicopter

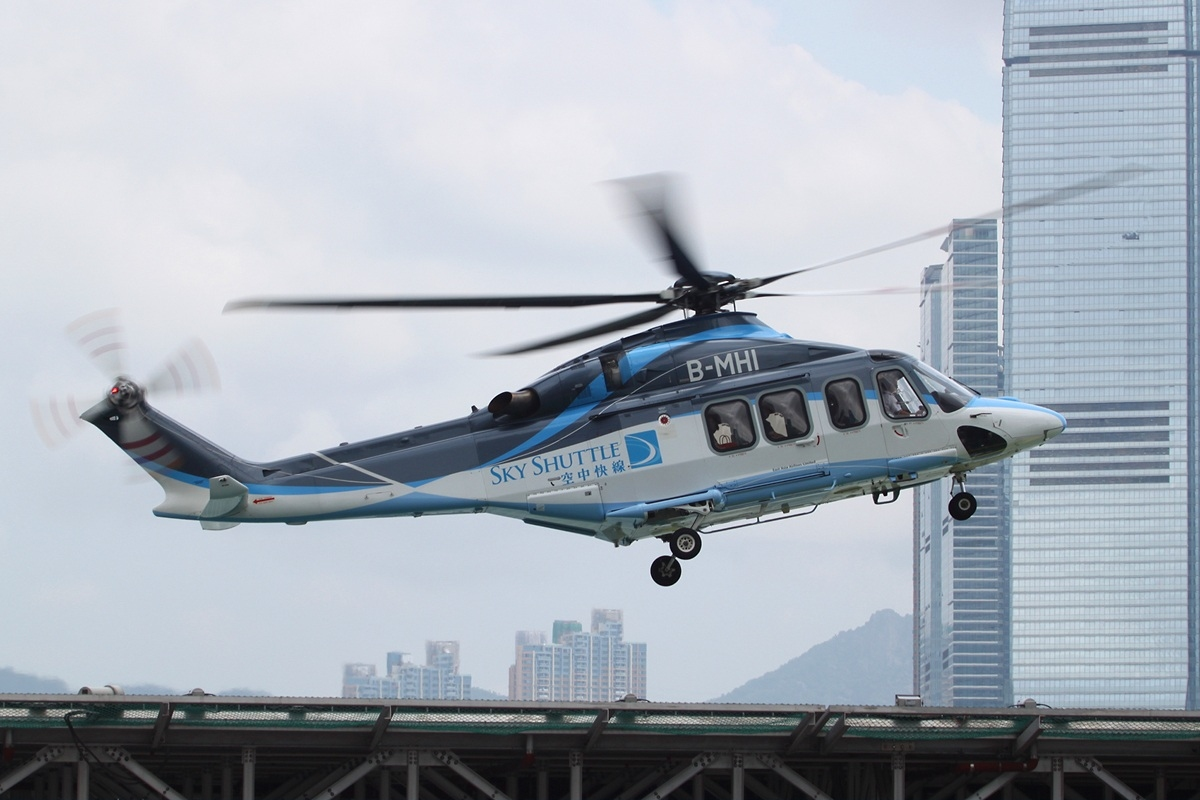
A Sky Shuttle Helicopters helicopter at Shun Tak Heliport, Hong Kong

Company name	Headquarters	Country	Other regions serviced	Scheduled passenger flights?	Subsidiaries
Abu Dhabi Aviation	Abu Dhabi	United Arab Emirates			Royal Jet; Maximus Air; ADA Training Center; AgustaWestland Aviation Services; ADA International Real Estate; ADA Millennium
Air Dynasty	Kathmandu	Nepal			
Air Greenland	Nuussuaq	Denmark (Greenland)		Yes	
Air Harrods	London	United Kingdom			
Air Senok	Colombo	Sri Lanka			
Air-Transport Europe	Poprad	Slovakia			
Altitude Air	Kathmandu	Nepal			
Atlantic Airways	Vágar	Denmark (Faroe Islands)		Yes	
Babcock Mission Critical Services	London	United Kingdom	Africa, Australia, North America, Scandinavia		Australia; Offshore; Onshore; Scandinavian AirAmbulance
Blade Urban Air Mobility	New York City	United States			
Bristow Helicopters	Houston	United States	Africa, Asia, Australia, Europe, South America		Bristow Norway
British International Helicopters	Coventry	United Kingdom	Falkland Islands		
Canadian Helicopters	Les Cèdres	Canada			
CHC Helicopter	Richmond	Canada	Africa, Australia, Brazil, Denmark, Ireland, Netherlands, Norway, United Kingdom		
Columbia Helicopters	Aurora	United States			
Cougar Helicopters	St. John's	Canada			
DAP Helicópteros	Punta Arenas	Chile		Yes	
Fishtail Air	Kathmandu	Nepal			
Global Vectra Helicorp	Mumbai	India			
Gulf Helicopters	Doha	Qatar	India, Middle East, North Africa		
Heli Air	Wellesbourne	United Kingdom			
Heli Air Monaco	Fontvieille	Monaco	France, Italy, Switzerland	Yes	
Heli Air Services	Sofia	Bulgaria	Afghanistan, Africa		
Heli Holland	Emmen	Netherlands			
Heliandes	Medellín	Colombia			
Helicol	Bogotá	Colombia			
Helicópteros de Guatemala	Guatemala City	Guatemala			
Helicópteros del Sureste	Mutxamel	Spain		Yes	
Helijet	Vancouver	Canada		Yes	
Heliswiss	Bern	Switzerland			
Helitrans	Stjørdal	Norway			
Hélity	Ceuta	Spain	Gibraltar, Morocco		
Kazaviaspas	Astana	Kazakhstan			
Lufttransport	Tromsø	Norway	Sweden	Yes	
Monacair	Monaco	Monaco	France	Yes	
Noordzee Helikopters Vlaanderen	Ostend	Belgium			
Pawan Hans	New Delhi	India		Yes	
Petroleum Air Services	Cairo	Egypt			
Petroleum Helicopters International	Lafayette	United States	Antarctic		
Polar Airlines	Yakutsk	Russia		Yes	
Shree Airlines	Kathmandu	Nepal			
Silkway Helicopter Services	Baku	Azerbaijan			
Simrik Air	Kathmandu	Nepal			
Sky Service	Almaty	Kazakhstan			
Sky Shuttle Helicopters	Macau	Macau	China, Hong Kong	Yes	
Summit Helicopters	Yellowknife	Canada	Indonesia, United Kingdom		
Toho Air Service	Tokyo	Japan		Yes	
UTair Aviation	Khanty-Mansiysk	Russia		Yes	
Various others, see separate article.		Russia		Yes for some	
Vietnam Helicopter Corporation	Hanoi	Vietnam	Southeast Asia		Central; Northern; Southern

=== Defunct or renamed ===
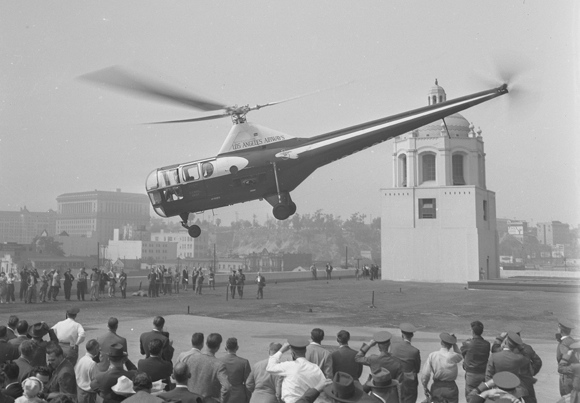
A Los Angeles Airways helicopter taking off from the roof of the Terminal Annex Post office to inaugurate helicopter air-mail service, 1947

Company name	Headquarters	Country	Commenced operations	Ceased operations
Air Alpha Greenland	Ilulissat	Denmark (Greenland)	1994	2006
Air America	Washington, DC	United States	1946	1976
Arizona Helicopters		United States	1970s	
Asian Airlines	Kathmandu	Nepal	1993	
Australian Helicopters		Australia		
Bajan Helicopters	Bridgetown	Barbados	1989	2009
Bond Air Services		Australia		
Bond Aviation Group	Staverton	United Kingdom	1961	2016
Bond Offshore Helicopters		Australia		
Boun Oum Airways			1964	1967
Braathens Helikopter	Sola	Norway	1989	1993
British Airways Helicopters		United Kingdom	1964	1986
Burundaiavia	Almaty	Kazakhstan	1946	?
Caribbean Helicopters / FlyCHL	Antigua	Antigua & Barbuda	1995	2019
Continental Air Services, Inc	Los Angeles, California	United States	1965	1965
Copterline		Estonia	1990	2010 and 2016 (2x)
Copterline Oy	Helsinki	Finland	2002	2010
East Asia Airlines				
East Pakistan Helicopter Service		East Pakistan	1960s	
Hong Kong Air International	Hong Kong	Hong Kong	1971	1976
Impro Airways	Kathmandu	Nepal	2006	2008
Jämtlands Flyg	Östersund	Sweden	1954	2019
Karnali Air	Kathmandu	Nepal		2001
Los Angeles Airways	Los Angeles, California	United States	1947	1971
New York Airways	New York City	United States	1949	1979
New York Helicopter	New York City	United States	1980	1988
Norrlandsflyg	Gothenburg	Sweden	1961	2011
Norsk Helikopter				
San Francisco and Oakland Helicopter Airlines	Oakland, California	United States	1961	1985
Schreiner Airways				
Sealand Helicopters	St. John's, Newfoundland	Canada	1977	1988
Silver State Helicopters	Las Vegas	United States	1999	2008
Universal Helicopters	St. John's	Canada	1963	2020
US Helicopter	New York City	United States	2004	2009
Vertical de Aviación	Bogotá	Colombia	1982	2023
Wiking Helikopter Service	Bremen	Germany	1975	2022

=== Services offered ===
Some companies focus solely on winning ongoing contracts in a single industry sector, such as oil & gas. Other companies cater to a wider range of clients by offering one-off charter flights on an ad hoc basis. Services can include:

- Aid – disaster relief, humanitarian aid
- Agriculture – crop dusting, game monitoring, hydroseeding, livestock mustering, pest control, wildlife management
- Firefighting – helicopter bucket, helitack
- Flight training
- Forestry – heli-logging, stream restoration
- Freight – aerial crane, airdrop; general cargo and mail delivery in remote areas
- Industrial – construction, inspection and maintenance of overhead power lines, pipelines, mobile phone towers, offshore wind farms, hydropower facilities, and other infrastructure
- Maritime – pilot transfer and other ship-to-shore transport
- Medical – air ambulance, medical evacuation
- Military – aeromedical evacuation, pilot training; airlift, vertical replenishment and other logistical support
- Oil & gas – transporting crews to and from offshore platforms
- Passenger – VIP & corporate charter; scheduled flights from remote areas
- Photography – aerial photography, archaeology, film production, photogrammetry, television news reporting
- Science – water sampling, wildlife monitoring, snow radar, support to research stations in the Arctic and Antarctic
- Search & rescue – air-sea rescue, mountain rescue
- Surveillance – border control, coast guard, police
- Survey – aeromagnetic, mineral exploration, reflection seismology
- Tourism – sightseeing tours, heliskiing

== Other helicopter companies ==
These are companies which do not qualify as airlines, strictly speaking, because they specialise in services other than the transport of passengers and cargo.

Company name	Headquarter country	Principal services	Status
Air Methods	United States	Medical evacuation, tourism	Active
Carson Helicopters	United States	Aerial lift, firefighting	Active
Croman Corporation	United States	Agriculture, forestry, industrial	Active
Erickson	United States	Aerial cranes, firefighting, forestry, industrial	Active
Evergreen International Aviation	United States	Agriculture, firefighting, forestry, industrial, military	Defunct
Global Traffic Network	United States	Traffic reporting	Active
Helog	Germany	Training	Active
Roberts Aircraft	United States	Agriculture, mapping	Active
Swanson Group Aviation	United States	Aerial cranes, firefighting, heli-logging, mapping	Active

== See also ==
- List of airlines
- List of rotorcraft
- List of small airlines and helicopter airlines of Russia
