= HNZ =

HNZ may refer to:

- Croat People's Union (Croatian: Hrvatska narodna zajednica)
- Heinz, an American food processing company
- Henderson–Oxford Airport, in North Carolina, United States
- Herzegovina-Neretva Canton (Croatian: Hercegovačko-neretvanska županija, HNŽ)
- HNZ Group, a Canadian helicopter operator
  - Helicopters (NZ), their New Zealand subsidiary
