= Helicopters (NZ) =

New Zealand-based helicopter operator

IATA	ICAO	Call sign
-	-	-
- Founded: 1955
- Operating bases: Perth, Western Australia; Karratha, Western Australia; New Plymouth, New Zealand
- Subsidiaries: Helicopters (Australia); Helicopters (Cambodia); Glacier Helicopters
- Parent company: Petroleum Helicopters International
- Headquarters: Nelson, New Zealand
- Revenue: CAD$26.8m
- Website: phi-int.com

Helicopters New Zealand or HNZ was a New Zealand–based helicopter operator serving the oil and gas, EMS and government markets. Operating a mix of light and medium turbine-engined helicopters, it performed helicopter transport and air work for a number of private and government clients across Australia, New Zealand, Southeast Asia and Antarctica.

== History ==
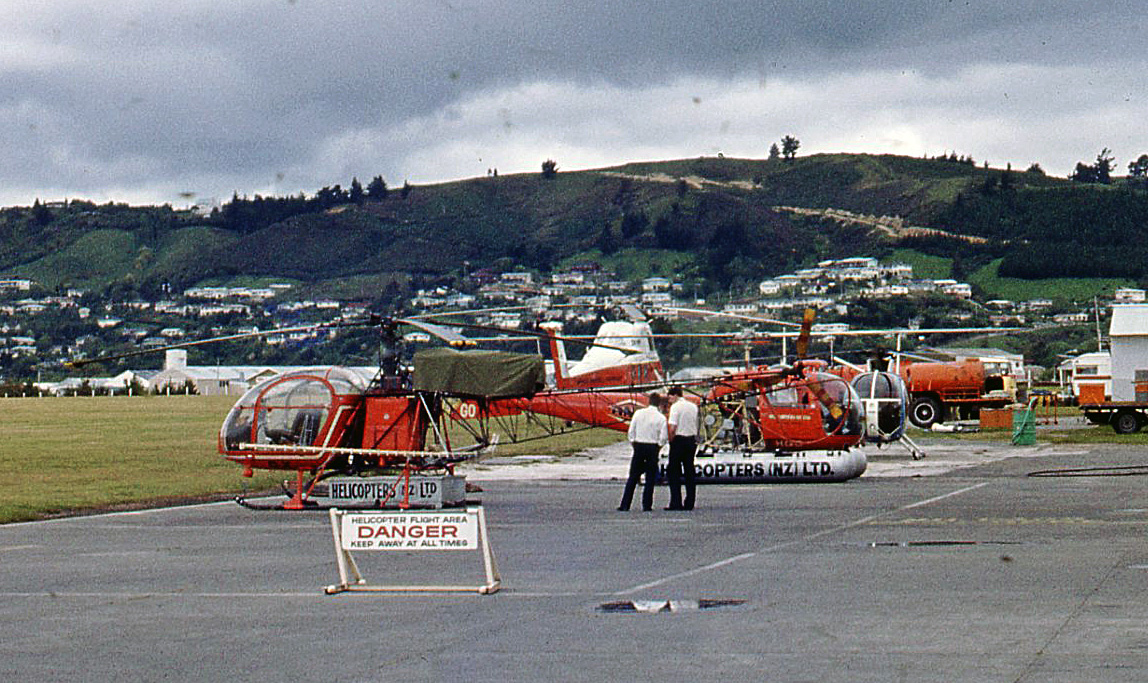
Helicopters New Zealand base, Nelson, 1969

Founded in 1955 in Timaru, New Zealand, Helicopters New Zealand commenced operations with a Bell 47, conducting agricultural operations on the New Zealand South Island. The company grew and started providing helicopter air work services for the Government of New Zealand and oil and gas clients in the 1960s.

In 1992, Helicopters New Zealand bought West Coast Helicopters renaming it Helicopters (Australia) Pty Ltd and obtained a foothold in the Australian Helicopter market.

In 2011, HNZ was purchased by Canadian Helicopters. In 2012, Canadian Helicopters Group Inc., the parent company for Canadian Helicopters and HNZ, changed its name to HNZ Group Inc.

HNZ Group Inc's operations in the Pacific were sold to Petroleum Helicopters International in October 2017. The remainder of HNZ Group Inc. was taken private and continued operations as Canadian Helicopters Limited.

== Clients ==
HNZ operated on behalf of the following organisations:

- Shell-Todd Oil (Oil & Gas)
- Rio Tinto (Pilot Transfers)
- FESA WA (Firebombing)
- Origin Energy (Oil & Gas)
- Esso (Oil & Gas)

== Fleet ==
=== Helicopters (NZ) fleet 1955 to 2006 ===
Aircraft	Introduced	Retard	Notes
Aérospatiale SA 315B Lama	1971	1996	Six helicopters
Aerospatiale SA 318C Alouette II Astazou	1975	1977	One helicopter
Aerospatiale SE 3160, SA 316A Alouette III	1969	1971	Two helicopters
Aerospatiale SA 316C Alouette III	1975	1978	Three helicopters
Bell 47D	1957	1963	Two helicopters
Bell 47D-1	1957	1965	Three helicopters
Bell 47G	1963	1968	One helicopter
Bell 47G-2	1965	1968	One helicopter
Bell 47G-3B	1965	1970	Three helicopters
Bell 47G-3B1	1969	1981	Six helicopters
Bell 47G-4	1965	1980	Five helicopters
Bell 47G-4A	1969	1981	Five helicopters
Bell 47J-2 Ranger	1968	1985	Three helicopters
Bell 47J-2A Ranger	1964	1965	One helicopter
Bell 205A Huey	1968	1969	One helicopter
Bell 206A JetRanger	1968	1969	One helicopter
Bell 206B JetRanger	1974	1994	Six helicopters
Bell 206B-2 JetRanger	1985	Current	Four helicopters. Three Bell 206B-2 jetRangers were still in service in 2006.
Bell 206B-3 JetRanger	1982	Current	Three helicopters. Three Bell 206B-3 JetRangers were still in service in 2006.
Bell 212	1975	Current	Seven helicopters. One Bell 212 was still in service in 2006.
Bell 412	2002	Current	One helicopter
Bell 412EP	2004	Current	One helicopter
Bell 412SP	1999	Current	One helicopter
Cessna 208B Grand Caravan	2003	2004	One aircraft
Eurocopter AS 350B Squirrel	1982	Current	12 helicopters. Two were in service in 2006.
Eurocopter AS 350B1 Squirrel	1998	1998	One helicopter
Eurocopter AS 350B2 Squirrel	1991	Current	18 helicopters. 11 were still in service in 2006.
Eurocopter AS 350B3 Squirrel	1988	Current	Eight helicopters. Four were still in service in 2006
Eurocopter AS 350BA Squirrel	1980	Current	15 helicopters. Eight were still in service in 2006.
Eurocopter AS 350D Squirrel	1994	Current	Four helicopters. Two were still in service in 2006.
Eurocopter AS 350D(BA) Squirrel	1998	Current	Two helicopters. Eight were still in service in 2006.
Eurocopter EC 120 Colibri	2003	2004	One helicopter
Hughes 396, 500C	1978	1981	One helicopter
Hughes 369HS, 500C	1975	1976	One helicopter
Hughes 369D, 500D	1977	2004	Nine helicopters
Hughes 369E	2002	2004	One helicopter
Piper PA-23 Aztec	1976	1982	One aircraft
Robinson R.44 II	2004	2005	One aircraft
Sikorsky S-55B	1962	1963	One helicopter. It crashed near Patea on 13 March 1963.
Sikorsky S-58ET	1974	1984	Two leased helicopters. The first S-58ET was leased form Cordan International. It was in service from 1974 to 1979. The second S-58ET was in service from 1983 to 1984.
Sikorsky S-61N	1976	1984	Two leased helicopters. The first S-61N was leased from Okanaga Helicopters, Vancouver. It was in service from 1976 to 1978. The second S-61N was in service from 1983 to 1984.
Sikorsky S-76A+ Spirit			Two helicopters

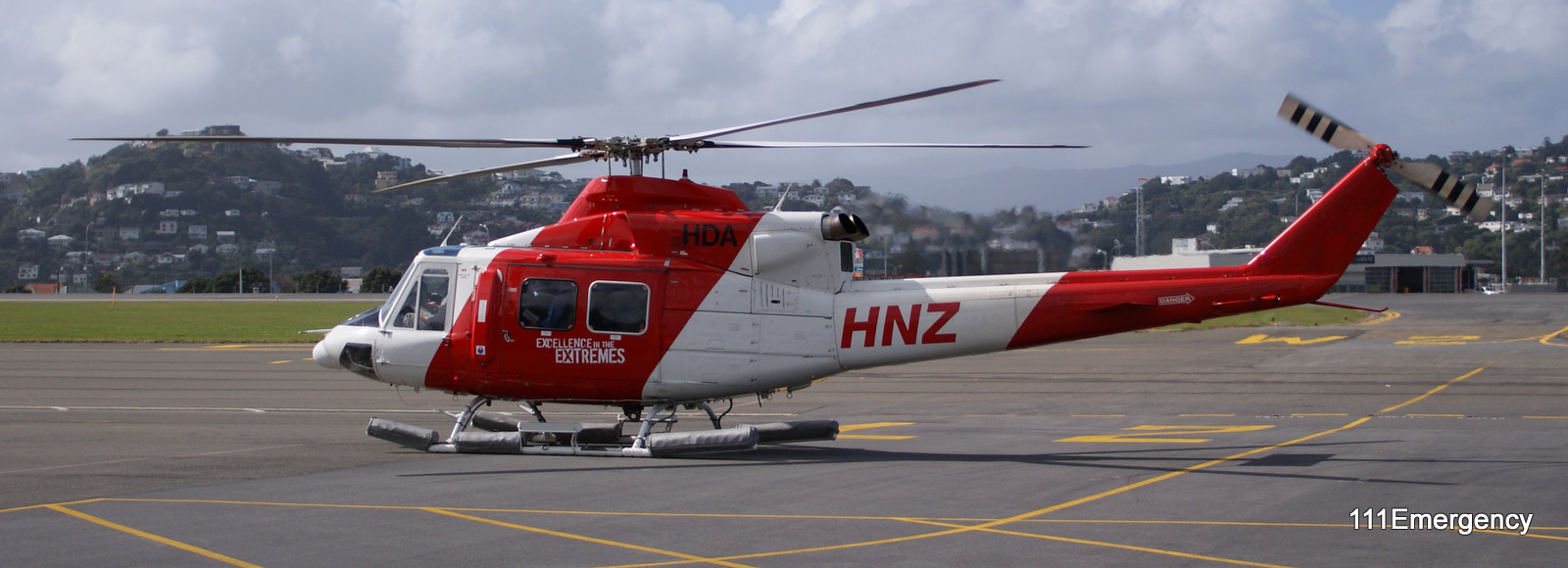
HNZ Bell 412

As of April 2012, the HNZ fleet consisted of over 45 aircraft:

- 15 x Eurocopter AS350 Series
- 2 x Eurocopter EC135 Series
- 1 x Eurocopter EC130 Series
- 3 x Eurocopter EC145 Series
- 3 x AgustaWestland AW139 Series
- 4 x Bell 412 Series
- 3 x AW109SP
