= Flight 17 =

Flight 17 may refer to:

- Emery Worldwide Airlines Flight 17, crashed on 16 February 2000
- Evergreen International Airlines Flight 17, crashed on 18 March 1989
- Malaysia Airlines Flight 17, shot down on 17 July 2014
- Pakistan International Airlines Flight 17, crashed on 2 February 1966
