= CHC Airways =

Dutch airline

IATA	ICAO	Call sign
AW	SCH	SCHREINER
- Founded: 1945 (as Schreiner Airways)
- Hubs: Amsterdam Airport Schiphol; Den Helder Airport
- Fleet size: 6
- Parent company: CHC Helicopter Corporation
- Headquarters: Hoofddorp, Netherlands
- Website: http://www.chc.ca/

CHC Airways is an airline based in Hoofddorp, Netherlands. It operates a fleet of six aircraft and helicopters on behalf of leading airlines and international oil companies. Its main bases are Amsterdam Airport Schiphol and Den Helder Airport, with hubs at Brussels Airport and Rotterdam The Hague Airport.

== History ==
The airline was established in 1945 as Schreiner Airways. It was part of the Schreiner Aviation Group which was purchased by the CHC Helicopter Corporation in 2005 and Schreiner Airways became CHC Airways.

In 2016, CHC ceased flight operations.

== Fleet ==
The CHC Airways fleet includes the following aircraft (at June 2018):

CHC Airways fleet
Aircraft	Total	Orders	Notes
Bombardier Dash 8 Q300	1	—	—
De Havilland Canada DHC-6 Twin Otter Series 300	5	—	—
Total	6	—	—
