= East Pakistan Helicopter Service =

Pakistan International Airlines helicopter services

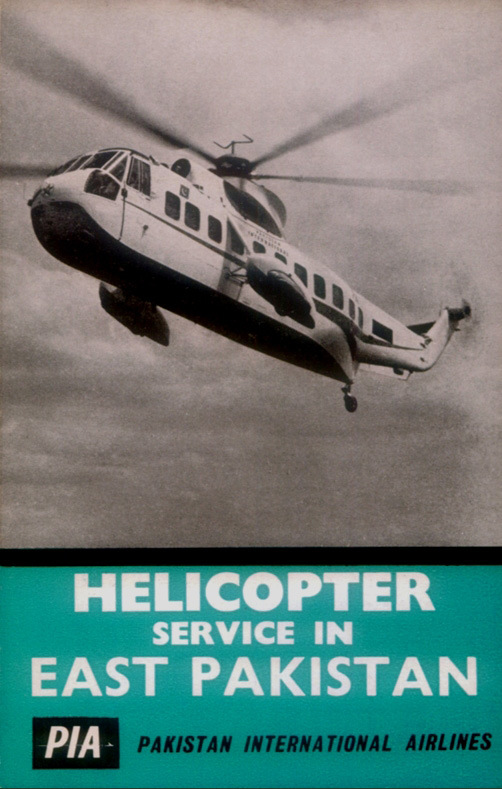
A poster of the helicopter service

The East Pakistan Helicopter Service refers to the scheduled helicopter services operated by Pakistan International Airlines (PIA) in East Pakistan during the 1960s. It was one of the earliest air services of its kind in the world and one of the most extensive helicopter networks in history.

== History ==
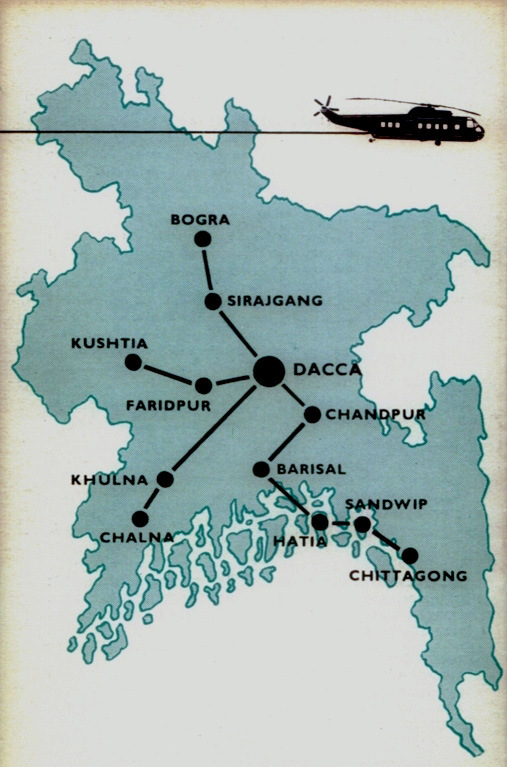
Route map

Pakistan's interest in helicopters for civil aviation began during American exploration of oil and gas in the remote areas of East Pakistan in the 1950s. In 1963, the national airline PIA (which evolved from the Calcutta-based Orient Airways) launched scheduled helicopter flights between Dacca and regional cities. For short-haul operations in East Pakistan's delta region, PIA set up a network of scheduled helicopter routes, using Sikorsky S-61Ns. The first commercial flight took place on 25 November 1963. The first routes were between Dacca and Khulna, the centre of the East Pakistani jute industry; and between Dacca and Faridpur.

The PIA S-61Ns were configured to carry a total of 24 passengers with four crew members and 1,800 lb of cargo. The first five pilots were trained with British European Airways (BEA) at a training facility in Kidlington, England, where they learnt to fly the Brantly B-2 light helicopter. They then converted to S-61N at Sikorsky's factory in Connecticut, United States. They returned to Pakistan for route flying on a Hiller UH-12E4 before delivery of the S-61Ns.

The helicopter route to Khulna reduced the 21-hour journey overland to 37 minutes by air. 20 towns and cities covered by the network, including Bogra, Sirajganj, Chittagong, Mongla, Kushtia, Barisal, Chandpur, Sandwip and Hatiya Upazila. The average price of a ticket was 25 rupees. It was the world's largest commercial helicopter network at the time.

The only air accident of the service involved Pakistan International Airlines Flight 17.

PIA began switching to fixed wing aircraft for domestic operations in the late 1960s. In modern-day Bangladesh, many airlines use turboprop planes for domestic operations.

== Fleet ==
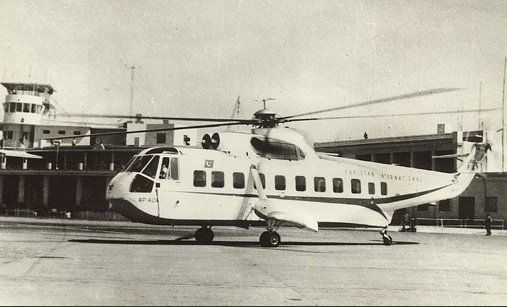
Pakistan International Airlines S-61 in Dacca.

PIA Helicopter Fleet in East Pakistan
Aircraft	In Fleet	Orders	Passengers		Routes	Notes
Aircraft	In Fleet	Orders	M	Total	Routes	Notes
Sikorsky S-61	3	—		24	Domestic
Total	3	—

== Accidents ==
On 2 February 1966, Flight 17, operated by a Sikorsky S-61 helicopter, crashed on a scheduled domestic flight in East Pakistan after the main gearbox failed, killing 23 of the 24 passengers and crew on board.

== Gallery ==
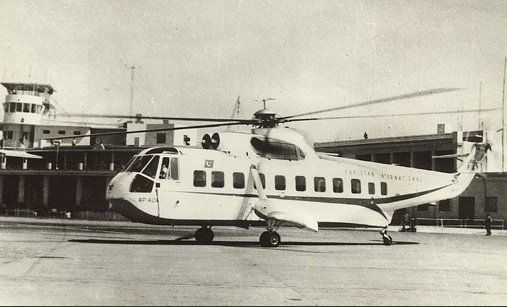
A PIA helicopter at Dacca Airport

== See also ==
- List of helicopter airlines
