= Ravi Rishi =

Indian businessman

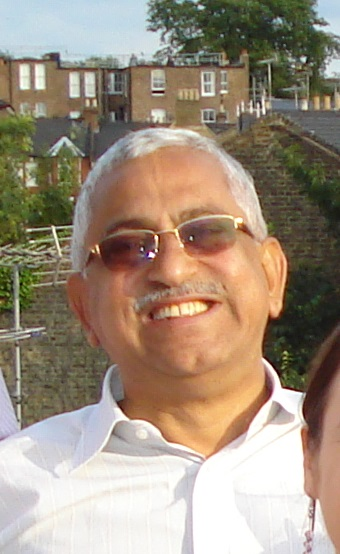
- Ravi Rishi
- Born: 9 September 1955; New Delhi
- Died: 13 March 2016 (aged 60); London
- Education: Bachelor of Engineering
- Alma mater: Indian Institute of Technology Delhi
- Occupation: Businessman
- Years active: 1977–2016

Ravi Rishi (full name Ravinder Kumar Rishi) was a non-resident Indian businessman, chair of the board of Vectra Group of companies and was based out of Richmond in the United Kingdom. Rishi also served as non executive director of Global Vectra Helicorp.

He died on 13 March 2016 in London.

== Early life and education ==
Ravi Rishi was born in New Delhi on 9 September 1955. He attended the Delhi Public School for primary and secondary education and subsequently earned a Bachelor of Engineering degree from the Indian Institute of Technology Delhi. Rishi moved to Singapore in late 1970s and finally to London where he lived till his death in 2016.

== Career ==
During his stay in Singapore and London, Rishi started investing in Eastern European companies. Rishi soon diversified and ran eighteen companies, mostly in India and Eastern Europe with businesses in aviation, heavy engineering, real estate, security systems, oil exploration and production, automotive, Information technology and service industry.

Rishi was accused of financial irregularities in supply of Tatra trucks to the Indian Army and was being investigated by the Central Bureau of Investigation in India. In 2014, the CBI closed the case due to insufficient evidence.
