= CHC Scotia Flight 23R =

Air accident at Sumburgh on 23 Aug 2013

Coordinates: 59.872°N 1.217°W

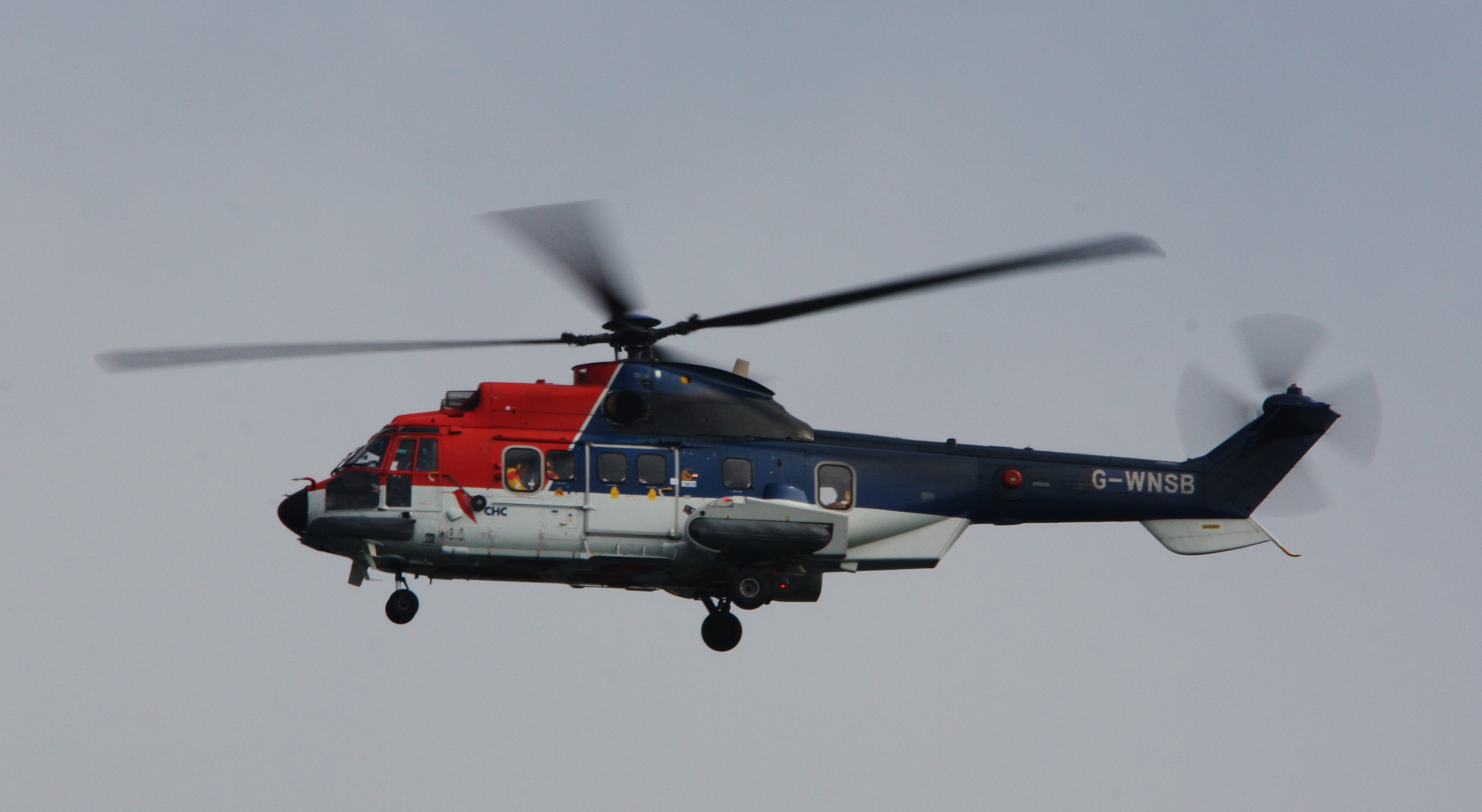
- G-WNSB, the accident aircraft, seen one month before the crash

Accident
- Date: 23 August 2013
- Summary: Failure to monitor instruments during approach, Pilot error
- Site: Fitful Head, 2 nm west of Sumburgh, Shetland Islands, ScotlandF

Aircraft
- Aircraft type: Eurocopter AS332L2 Super Puma
- Operator: CHC Scotia
- ICAO flight No.: HKS23R
- Call sign: HELIBUS 23 ROMEO
- Registration: G-WNSB
- Flight origin: Aberdeen Airport, Scotland
- Stopover: Alwyn North oil rig
- Last stopover: Borgsten Dolphin
- Destination: Sumburgh Airport, Scotland
- Occupants: 18
- Passengers: 16
- Crew: 2
- Fatalities: 4
- Injuries: 14
- Survivors: 14

On 23 August 2013, a Eurocopter AS332 Super Puma helicopter belonging to CHC Scotia crashed into the sea 2 nautical miles (3.7 km; 2.3 mi) from Sumburgh in the Shetland Islands, Scotland, while en route from the Borgsten Dolphin drilling rig. The accident killed four passengers; twelve other passengers and two crew were rescued with injuries. A further passenger committed suicide in 2017 as a result of PTSD caused by the crash. An investigation by the UK's Air Accident Investigation Branch concluded in 2016 that the accident was primarily caused by pilot error in failing to monitor instruments during approach. The public inquiry concluded in October 2020 that the crash was primarily caused by pilot error.

== Flight history ==
The flight took off from Aberdeen Airport and stopped at two oil rigs to pick up passengers. Landing first on the Total North Alwyn Platform before flying the short distance to the Borgsten Dolphin; alongside the Dunbar platform as an accommodation tender. After taking off the helicopter was destined to land at Sumburgh Airport to refuel before flying on to Aberdeen Airport.

The weather conditions were a light breeze (17 knots) with mist.

== Accident ==
The helicopter was on an otherwise normal approach to Sumburgh Airport, when at 18:17–18:20 local time, the aircraft lost contact with air traffic control. No mayday was sent out by the pilots as they attempted to make a controlled ditching into the North Sea, 1.5-2 nm west from Sumburgh. The helicopter fell into the sea and then turned upside down during the evacuation. The helicopter was found broken into several pieces up against rocks at Garths Ness.

Recovered flight data noted by the Air Accident Investigation Branch suggests that the helicopter engines remained powered until impact. The manufacturer's initial analysis based on that data indicated that a combination of factors had placed the helicopter into a vortex ring state at low altitude which made impact "unavoidable".

== Rescue operations ==
The Lerwick and Aith Royal National Lifeboat Institution lifeboats and the Sumburgh based Coastguard helicopter were sent to find the downed helicopter. Two helicopters from Bond Offshore Helicopters, an RAF helicopter from RAF Lossiemouth, the passenger ferry MV Hjaltland and a cargo ship, the MS Helliar also joined in the search. Coastguard Rescue Teams from Sumburgh, Lerwick, West Burra Isle, Bressay and Walls were involved in the transfer of casualties to the ambulance service, the search for missing casualties and the logging of washed up wreckage on the days following the crash. The helicopter was found;12 passengers and two crew were rescued and sent to Gilbert Bain Hospital in Lerwick, Shetland Islands. One of the rescued passengers died from their injuries whilst being transported to the hospital.

Two bodies floated free of the aircraft and were recovered by Lifeboat. Another was recovered later from the wreckage.

== Aftermath ==
A day after the accident, CHC Scotia temporarily suspended all Super Puma L2 flights worldwide. The Helicopter Safety Steering Group said that all four different models of the Super Puma should be grounded over safety concerns. On 10 September 2013, the Transport Select Committee began an inquiry into the safety of offshore helicopters in the North Sea.

== Investigation ==
The Police Scotland and Air Accidents Investigation Branch launched investigations into the cause of the accident. On 5 September 2013, the Air Accidents Investigation Branch special bulletin reported that there is no evidence of a causal technical failure that could have led to the crash. Both the wreckage and black boxes were still being examined.

In October 2020, an inquiry led by Sheriff Principal Derek Pyle concluded that the crash was predominantly caused by pilot error. The inquiry had been delayed by the COVID-19 pandemic.

== See also ==
- 2009 Bond Helicopters Eurocopter AS332 crash
- Bristow Flight 56C
- Helikopter Service Flight 165
