= Craig Dobbin =

Canadian businessman (1935–2006)

- Born: 13 September 1935; St. John's, Newfoundland
- Died: 8 October 2006 (aged 71); Beachy Cove, Newfoundland and Labrador
- Occupations: Chairman, CHC Helicopter

Craig Lawrence Dobbin, OC (12 September 1935 – 7 October 2006) was an industrialist and chairman and chief executive officer of CHC Helicopter Corporation, a public company traded on the Toronto Stock Exchange and the New York Stock Exchange. The company, headquartered in Richmond, BC, is the world's largest helicopter company, providing global helicopter services.

Dobbin was born in St. John's, Newfoundland and received his early education at Saint Bonaventure's College in St. John's. After a period of employment with P. J. Dobbin Lumber and Building Supplies, Dobbin engaged in a short-haul trucking venture and underwater salvage operation until he started real estate speculation in St. John's in 1963. The venture, later known as Omega Investments Ltd., moved operations to Ottawa and subsequently established offices in Montreal.

In the early 1970s, Dobbin returned to Newfoundland, where he established Sealand Helicopters in 1977. In 1988, Dobbin merged Toronto Helicopters, Okanagan Helicopters and Sealand Helicopters into CHC (Canadian Holding Company) and operated as CHC Helicopters and Canadian Helicopters. CHC acquired British International Helicopters in 1994. CHC later divested itself of all domestic helicopter operations in Canada (except a base in Halifax, Nova Scotia). In 1999, CHC Helicopter Corporation, with Dobbin as CEO and chairman, took control of Helikopter Services Group ASA of Norway, making CHC Helicopters the largest provider of global helicopter transportation.

Dobbin was Chairman of the Ireland Canada University Foundation located in Dublin which assists and promotes Canadian Studies in Irish Universities; a member of the Board of Directors of Newfoundland Capital Corporation and was the Honorary Consul General of Ireland for Newfoundland and Labrador.

In June 1990, the Government of France awarded Dobbin with the Médaille de l'Aéronautique, designed to reward civil or military people who have distinguished themselves in the development of aviation; in October 1990, he received an Honorary Doctor of Science Degree from Saint Mary's University; he was appointed an Officer of the Order of Canada in 1992. In 1995, he was bestowed with an Honorary Doctor of Laws Degree from the National University of Ireland; in 1996, he was appointed the Outstanding Individual Philanthropist for the year from the Canadian Society of Fund-raising Executives, and presented with both Newfoundland's Transportation Person of the Year award and the National Transportation Person of Year Award.

In January 2000, he was awarded the honour of "Newfoundland's Businessman of the Millennium" and in May 2000, he received an Honorary Doctor of Laws Degree from Memorial University of Newfoundland. In October 2000, Dobbin was awarded the Atlantic Canada Entrepreneur of the Year, this program, founded by Ernst & Young, celebrates great entrepreneurs and heightens awareness of the economic effect of entrepreneurial ventures.

Dobbin died on 7 October 2006, one day after he had taken a leave of absence from his duties at CHC.

== See also ==
- List of people of Newfoundland and Labrador
- List of communities in Newfoundland and Labrador
