= Snowy Hydro SouthCare =

Former helicopter medical service in Australia

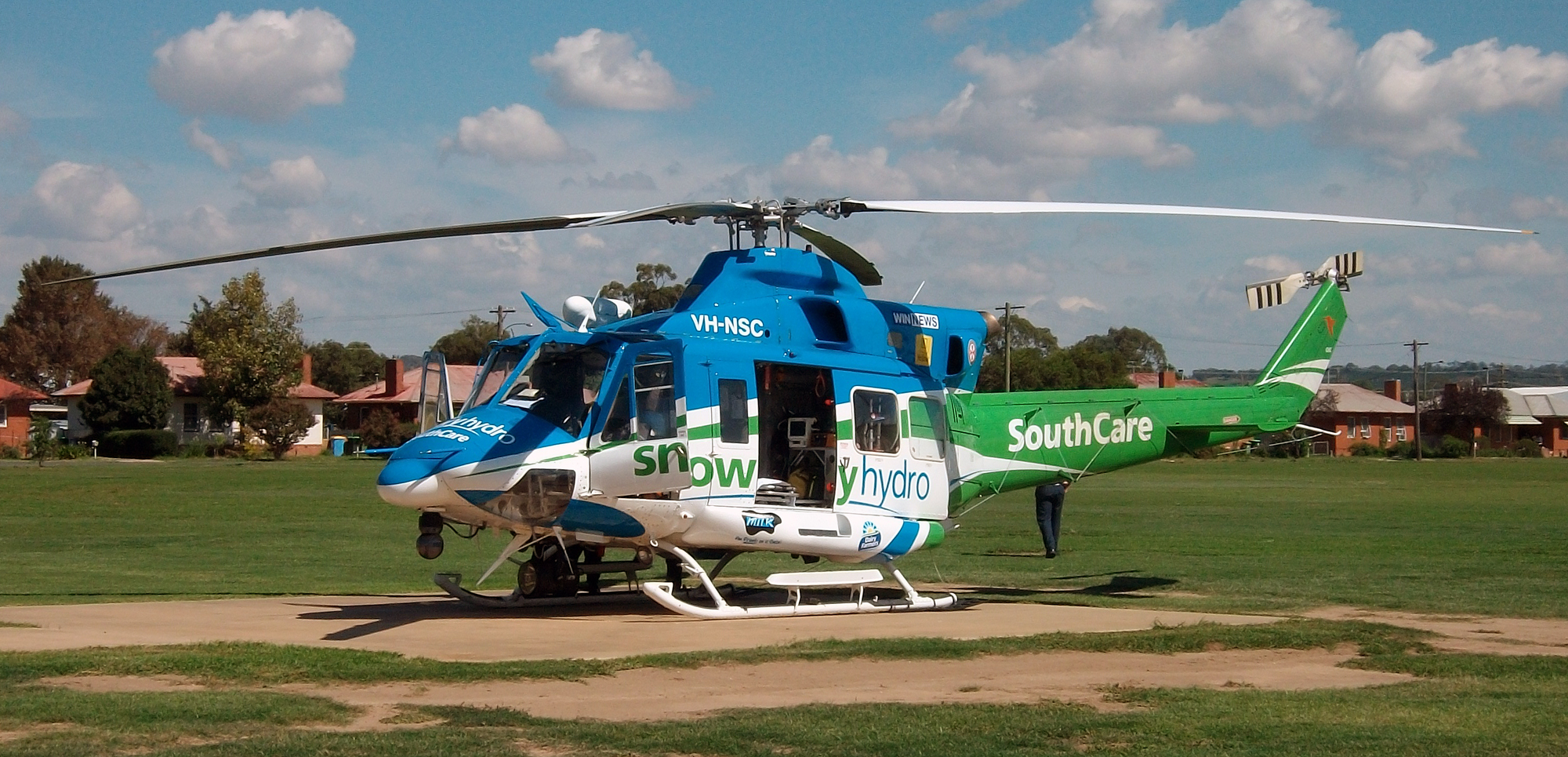
- The SouthCare Bell 412 Helicopter
- Formation: 1998
- Purpose: Search and rescue, patient retrieval
- Headquarters: Symonston, Australian Capital Territory
- Region served: Australian Capital Territory, Southeastern New South Wales
- CEO: Carol Bennett
- Website: www.snowyhydrosouthcare.com.au

Snowy Hydro SouthCare was a rescue and aeromedical helicopter service based in Canberra, Australia from 1998 to 2017.

The area served covered the Australian Capital Territory, as well as parts of New South Wales including the South Coast, Southern Tablelands, Central West and Riverina regions as far south as the border with Victoria. SouthCare operated a single Bell 412 (VH-NSC) through CHC Helicopters Australia, with medical crews provided by the Capital Region Retrieval Service, a part of the ACT Government Health Directorate. The service was backed by significant funding from Hydro-electric energy company Snowy Hydro. By the time the service ceased, SouthCare had conducted 6,963 missions.

Missions flown by the helicopter included primary, or rescue missions, where patients are stabilised and transported to major hospitals from accident scenes. Secondary missions involved patient transfers between major and regional hospitals to access urgent specialist treatment. Other missions include search and rescue and aerial firefighting. The aircraft was based at a dedicated facility for emergency services helicopters located in Symonston, adjacent to the Monaro Highway.

In April 2017, Toll Group commenced operating an Agusta-Westland AW139 from the Canberra SouthCare base as part of the NSW Ambulance's new statewide helicopter retrieval network.

== History ==
Established in October 1998, the SouthCare helicopter service participated in a major maritime rescue operation in December of that year when the 1998 Sydney to Hobart Yacht Race fleet encountered severe weather conditions, resulting in the loss of 6 lives and 5 yachts. The SouthCare crews rescued nine sailors from two stricken vessels, Stand Aside and Midnight Special. As recognition for their role in the rescue, the Cruising Yacht Club of Australia made a donation of $20,000 to the service in 2002.

In 1999, Canberra International Airport signed a five-year agreement to allow SouthCare to operate from the airport exempt from rent. The interim measure allowed the service to maintain its operations while planning and construction of a dedicated facility progressed.

On 13 January 2003, the helicopter was carrying Chief Minister Jon Stanhope with the Territory's Chief Fire Control Officer surveying bushfires burning in the Namadgi National Park near Canberra. The helicopter responded to an emergency call when a second helicopter involved in water-bombing operations crashed into Bendora Dam. Both Stanhope and Fire Officer Peter Lucas-Smith joined the SouthCare paramedic in the subsequent rescue, stripping down to their underwear and swimming to the sinking helicopter and pulling the unconscious pilot from the sinking aircraft. All three men received bravery medals for their role in the rescue. In the following days the helicopter was engaged in water bombing activities during the 2003 Canberra bushfires disaster.

In June 2013, SouthCare successfully applied for a $500,000 grant from the Australian Government's Regional Development Fund. The money was to be used to fund the construction of an administration- and training facility at the Symonston base.

From 2017, the service will be part of the NSW Helicopter Retrieval Network and will upgrade to an AgustaWestland AW139. In November 2016, the entire board of Snowy Hydro SouthCare resigned over incoming Helicopter Provider Toll's takeover of sponsorship arrangement for the service, include the naming rights sponsor.

Toll Air Ambulance began operating the ACT region's service on 3 April 2017.

== Funding ==
In addition to naming rights sponsor Snowy Hydro, the service is widely supported through local business and community sponsorship as well as volunteer participation to help raise awareness for SouthCare. In 2013, sponsorship raised just over $1,000,000 while donations from the community raised a further $623,000. Additionally, the service sells merchandise and holds regular fund raising events, such as public open days at its Symonston base. Additionally, the ground infrastructure is jointly funded by both the ACT Government and NSW Health who provide 24 hour medical staff as well as training facilities.

== See also ==
- Emergency medical services in Australia
- Air Ambulance
- Southcare Base Heliport
