= Southcare Base Heliport =

Heliport in Canberra, Australia

Coordinates: 35.378449°S 149.171121°E

Southcare Base Heliport is a heliport in Canberra that is part of Snowy Hydro SouthCare and as a landing area for Canberra Hospital.

== Facilities ==
The heliport has a fuel refilling station and two possible landing spots for helicopters. There is the main helipad, and then there is the backup landing spot, around 15 m to the north-west of the main helipad.
