= De Kooy Airfield =

De Kooy Airfield Vliegveld De Kooy
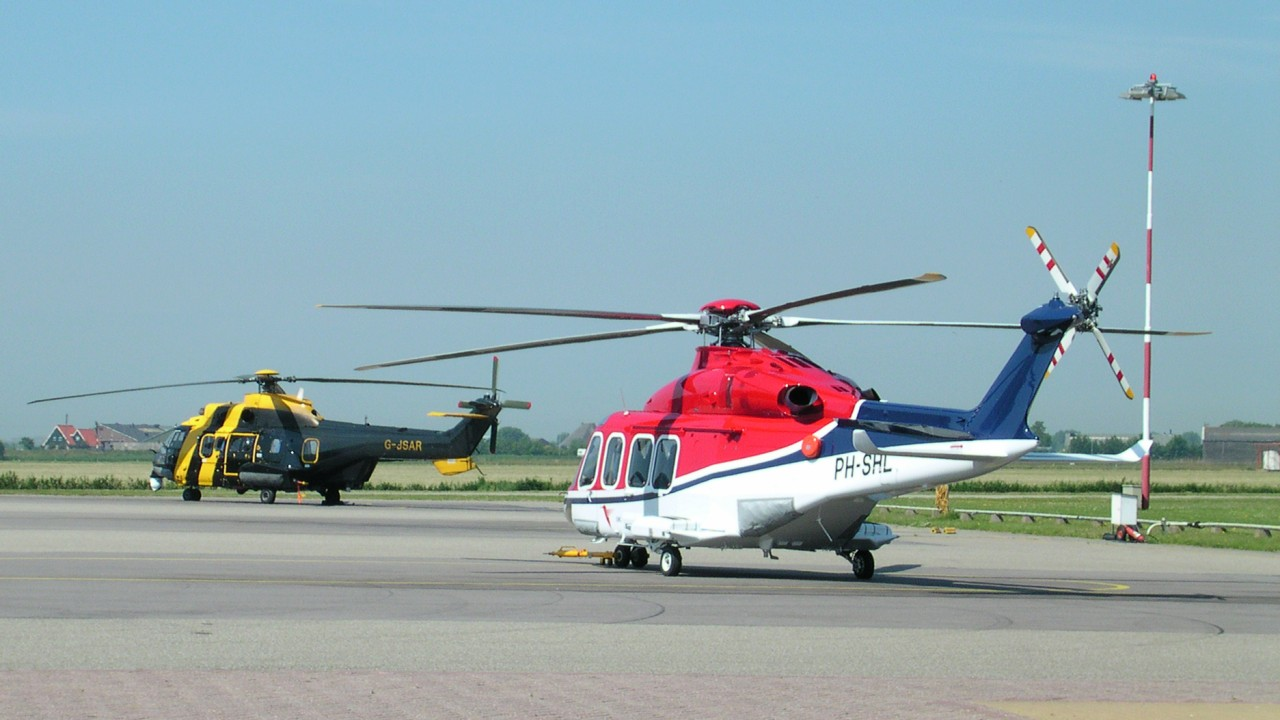
- IATA: DHR; ICAO: EHKD

Summary
- Airport type: Military/Public
- Operator: Royal Netherlands Navy / Den Helder Airport CV
- Location: Den Helder, Netherlands
- Elevation AMSL: 4 ft (1.2 m)
- Coordinates: 52°55′25″N 004°46′50″E
- Website: www.DenHelderAirport.nl
- Interactive map of De Kooy Airfield

Runways
Direction	Length		Surface
Direction	m	ft	Surface
03/21	1,275	4,183	Concrete / asphalt
- Sources: Airport website, AIP

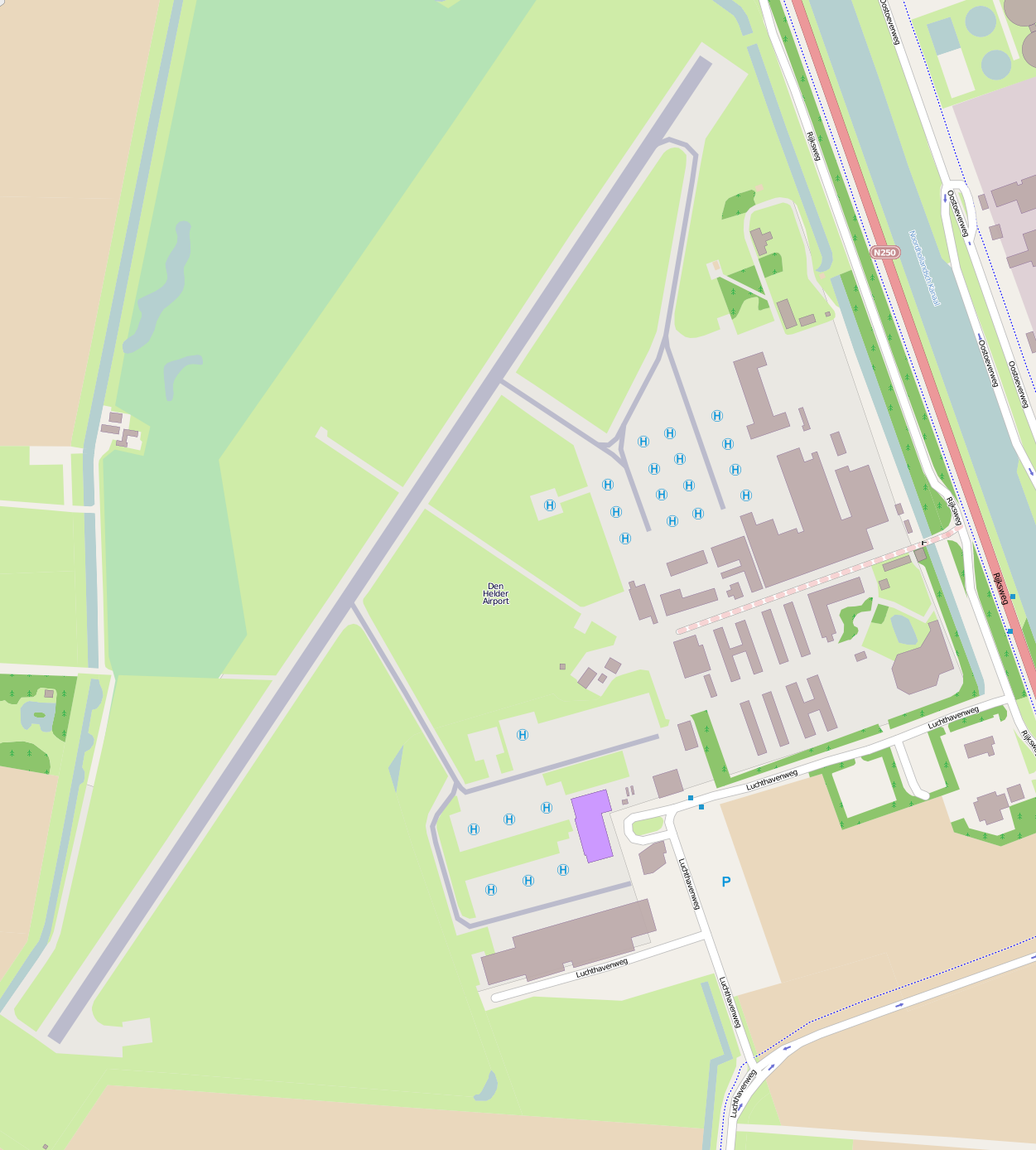
OpenStreetMap of the airfield.

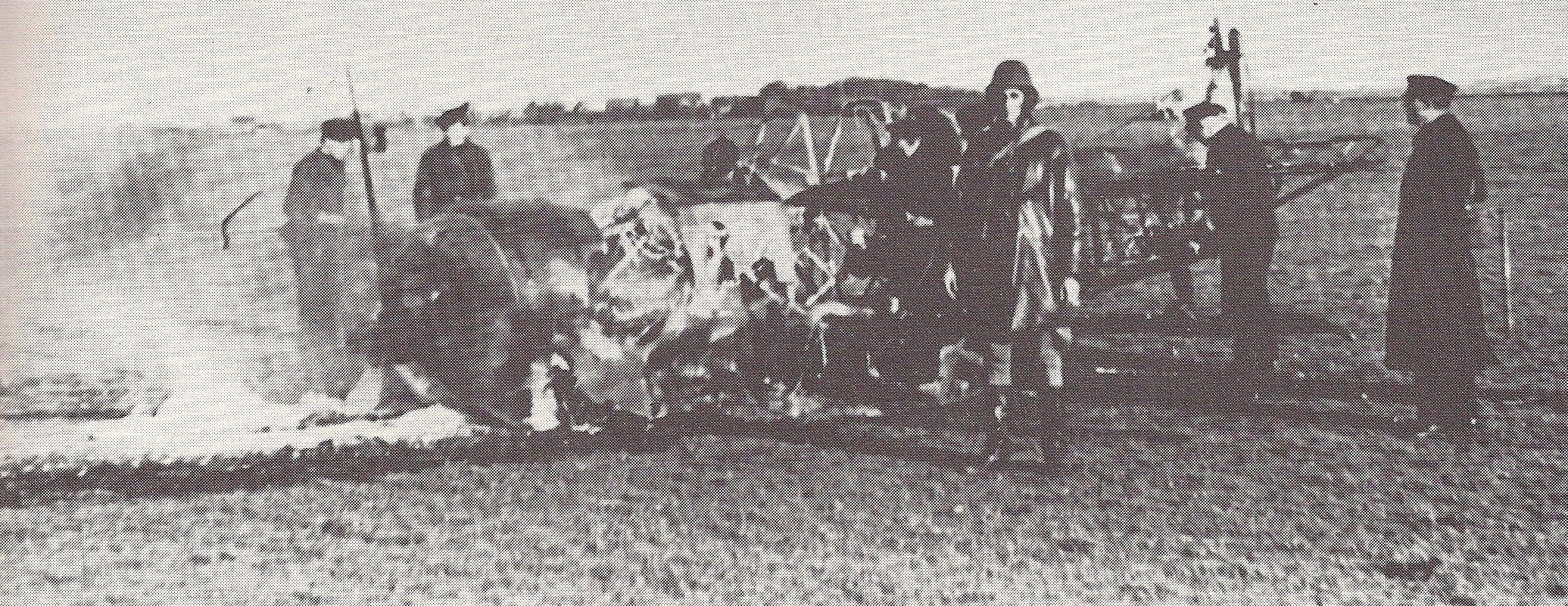
A pilot next to his downed Fokker D.XXI at De Kooy in May 1940 during the Battle of the Netherlands

De Kooy Airfield (Dutch: Vliegveld De Kooy) (IATA: DHR, ICAO: EHKD) is an airfield 2.9 NM (5.4 km; 3.3 mi) south of Den Helder, Netherlands, named after the nearby hamlet De Kooy. It serves as both a civilian airport under the name Den Helder Airport and a naval airport under the name Maritime Airfield De Kooy (Dutch: Maritiem Vliegkamp De Kooy).

Most movements on the De Kooy are made by helicopters, bringing workers to and from offshore oilrigs and naval helicopters such as the NH90 of the Naval Aviation Service of the Royal Netherlands Navy. Fixed-wing aircraft visit and operate from the airport alongside. Skyline Aviation operates from De Kooy, mainly operating business aircraft and also do airwork such as aerial photography for civilian and military contractors. Amongst its fleet of aircraft most noticeable are several Aero L-39 Albatros jets.

== History ==
The airport was constructed in 1918 for the Royal Netherlands Navy, whose primary base was and still is located in Den Helder. A seaplane base already existed nearby on the south side of Texel however the navy required an airport for conventional aircraft as well. The base came under German control during the Second World War and was renamed Fliegerhorst De Kooy. It suffered heavy damage during the war, this despite the construction of heavy anti-aircraft defences in the area. After the war, the need for a naval air base in the area remained, and the airport was repaired. In 1960 a concrete runway was constructed, the base using a simple grass field prior to that. The retirement of the last aircraft carrier operated by the Dutch navy, the HNLMS Karel Doorman, in 1968, meant that the navy started to replace its fixed-wing aircraft based at De Kooy with helicopters. In the 1980s, the need for offshore helicopter services for oilrigs in the North Sea resulted in the military sharing the base with civilian users.

== Future ==
The oil fields in the North Sea will eventually be depleted and when that happens the airport would lose most of its helicopter movements and thus alternative markets are being looked at, such as business and holiday flights.

== Airlines and destinations ==
There are currently no scheduled services to and from Den Helder. A service to Manchester and Norwich offered by Loganair was briefly operated in March 2013. This route was terminated after only two weeks of service due to weak demand.

== Based units ==
=== Royal Netherlands Navy ===
Part of the Defence Helicopter Command of the Royal Netherlands Air and Space Force

    - 7 Squadron (NH90 air and ground crew training), with NH90 NFH, and NH90 TTH
    - 860 Squadron, with NH90 NFH helicopters
    - 990 Squadron (Maintenance)
