= Impro Airways =

IATA	ICAO	Call sign
—	—	—
- Founded: 2006
- Ceased operations: 2008
- AOC #: 044/2005
- Hubs: Tribhuvan International Airport
- Fleet size: 1 (at closure)
- Headquarters: Nepal

Impro Airways was a helicopter airline based at Tribhuvan International Airport in Kathmandu, Nepal, operating chartered helicopter services.

== History ==
The Civil Aviation Authority of Nepal (CAAN) granted Impro Airways an Air Operators Certificate in 2006 permitting it to operate domestic charter services to remote sectors with three passenger and cargo-versioned MI-17 (MI-8 AMT) MTV helicopters, after it initially planned to operate a fleet of Dornier 228 aircraft.

On January 10, 2010, the Civil Aviation Authority of Nepal officially revoked Cosmic Air's Air operator's certificate, after it ceased operations in 2008.

== Destinations ==
Impro Airways was permitted to operate charter flights to any airport or heliport in Nepal.

== Fleet ==
At the time of closure, the only aircraft that Impro Airways operated was a MI-17 (MI-8 AMT) MTV helicopter.
