= Petroleum Helicopters International =

Airline of the United States

PHI, Inc.
IATA	ICAO	Call sign
—	PHM	PETROLEUM
- Founded: 1949
- Fleet size: 259
- Traded as: Nasdaq: PHIIK (non-voting); Russell 2000 Index component
- Headquarters: Lafayette, Louisiana
- Key people: James Hinch CAO
- Website: www.phihelico.com

Petroleum Helicopters International, Inc. (PHI - Now PHI Aviation, LLC), is an American commercial helicopter operator, founded in 1949, by Robert L. Suggs. The company is based in Lafayette, Louisiana and provides service for the oil and gas industry, aeromedical services, pilot training and aircraft maintenance.

In October 2017, PHI acquired Helicopters (NZ) from HNZ Group.

On March 15, 2019, the company filed for Chapter 11 bankruptcy.

On June 5, 2019, court-supervised arbitration announced an agreement to force the retirement of CEO Al Gonsoulin and strip him of his shares.

== History ==
PHI Inc. was founded by Robert L. Suggs and Maurice M. Bayon with a startup cost of $100,000, and three Bell 47 helicopters. They started by providing service to a seismographic group working in the wetlands of Louisiana. The company's service extended to offshore drilling platforms in the Gulf of Mexico, and grew their fleet with the addition of the Sikorsky S-55 and the Sikorsky S-58 helicopters. Over the next couple of decades the company expanded their fleet to 300 helicopters, which was the biggest non-military group of aircraft., and constructed the world's largest heliport at Lake Palourde in Morgan City In 1981 Petroleum Helicopters created PHI Air Medical, and became a provider of aeromedical services.

== Fleet B ==
PHI Inc. owns or operates 259 aircraft domestically and internationally. 162 aircraft are dedicated to its Oil and Gas segment. 88 aircraft are dedicated to its Air Medical segment. They also operate five aircraft for the National Science Foundation in Antarctica.

Small Helicopters
Aircraft	Total	Notes
Bell 407		
Bell 206L		
Bell 212		
Bell 412		
BK-117		
Eurocopter EC 135		
Eurocopter EC145		
Eurocopter AS350		
AW139		
Sikorsky S-76		
Sikorsky S-92	39	
Total Number of Aircraft	256	
