= Global Vectra Helicorp =

India's largest private helicopter company

Global Vectra Helicorp Limited
- Company type: Public
- Traded as: BSE: 532773; NSE: GLOBALVECT
- Industry: Aviation
- Predecessor: Azal (company)
- Founded: 1997; 29 years ago
- Headquarters: Mumbai, India
- Number of locations: Mumbai, Delhi, Bangalore
- Area served: India
- Key people: Ravi Rishi; S. J. S. Saighal (Chairman)
- Services: Offshore & onshore helicopter transportation services
- Website: https://www.globalhelicorp.com/

Global Vectra Helicorp Limited (GVHL) is India's largest private helicopter company. It has a fleet of 29 aircraft ranging from small light helicopters to medium-sized twin engined helicopters seating 4 to 15 passengers. The company is promoted by Non-resident Indian businessman Ravi Rishi.

The company's operational headquarters are in Mumbai at the Juhu Aerodrome where it services the oil and gas industry with forward bases at Visakhapatnam and Rajahmundry. The onshore operations, cover the entire Indian subcontinent, and is based in New Delhi and Bangalore. GVHL is listed on the National Stock Exchange and the Bombay Stock Exchange having ISO 9001-2015, 14001–2015, and OHSAS 18001-2007 certifications covering flight operations, engineering, safety, quality control, and commercial systems.

== History ==
The company was founded in 1997 as Azal and started off-shore operations in 1998 with 3 helicopters. The UK based businessman Ravi Rishi of the Vectra Group acquired it in 2004 and the company went public in 2006. A new hangar measuring 6000 square metres was inaugurated in January 2009. The company's maintenance facility for its Bell fleet housed in this hangar meets international quality standards and has received certification from the DGCA.

As reported on 25 February 2026, the Indian Navy has wet leased two AW139 from the firm. The contract was signed few months ago and one is already operating under one of the Commands. The Eastern and Western Naval Command will operate one helicopter each and the numbers could be increased depending on the feedback from the ground formations. The helicopters will be deployed for logistics operations only, not military.

== Birdie airport shuttle service ==
Birdie operates twin-engine helicopters seating 9 passengers from Bangalore International Airport Limited (BIAL), 40 km from the city centre, to helipads at HAL Airport, Whitefield, Electronics City, and Mysore.

== Fleet ==
Helicopter	In service	Orders
Bell 412EP	17	1
AS350 B3	3	–
AS350 B3E	3	–
AW139	4	–
AW169	3	2
Total	30	2
