= Schreiner Airways =

Airline of the Netherlands, 1945–2005

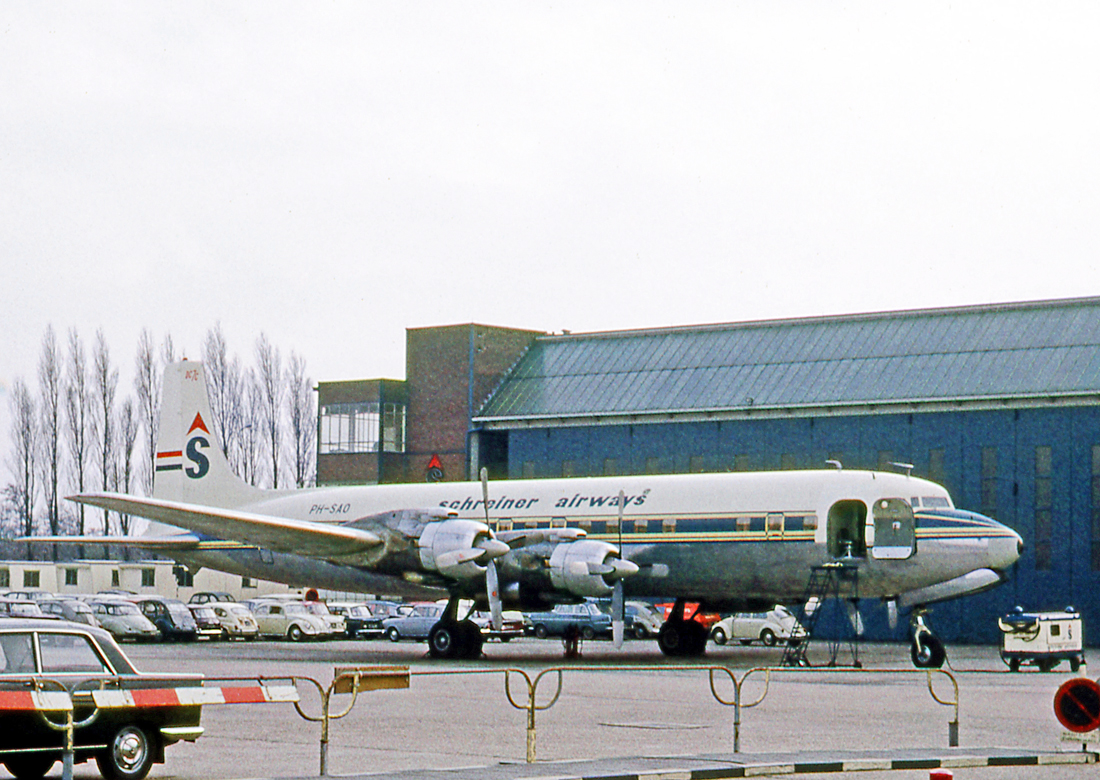
- Douglas DC-7C of Schreiner Airways at Amsterdam Airport in 1967
| IATA | ICAO | Call sign |
|---|---|---|
| AW | SCH | SCHREINER |
- Founded: 1945
- Ceased operations: 2005
- Fleet size: See Fleet below
- Headquarters: the Netherlands

Schreiner Airways was a charter, passenger and cargo airline based in the Netherlands.

== History ==
Schreiner was an offshore helicopter operator which was founded in 1945. The various flight operations were split amongst several companies of the Schreiner Aviation Group, such as Schreiner Airways, Schreiner North Sea Helicopters and Schreiner Aviation Training. The Schreiner Aviation Group was purchased by the CHC Helicopter Corporation in 2005 and Schreiner Airways became CHC Airways.

=== Flight operations in the 1960s ===
Having previously operated smaller aircraft types, Schreiner Aerocontractors NV acquired two Douglas DC-3 twin engined 28-seat airliners in 1963 and operated them on intra-European passenger and freight charter flights. The aircraft were disposed of in 1967. Between April 1964 and December 1967 a total of six owned and leased Fokker Friendship twin-engined turboprop airliners were flown on European passenger flights. Three Douglas DC-7C long range airliners were operated on intercontinental charter flights between July 1965 and June 1968.

== Schreiner Airways Cargo ==
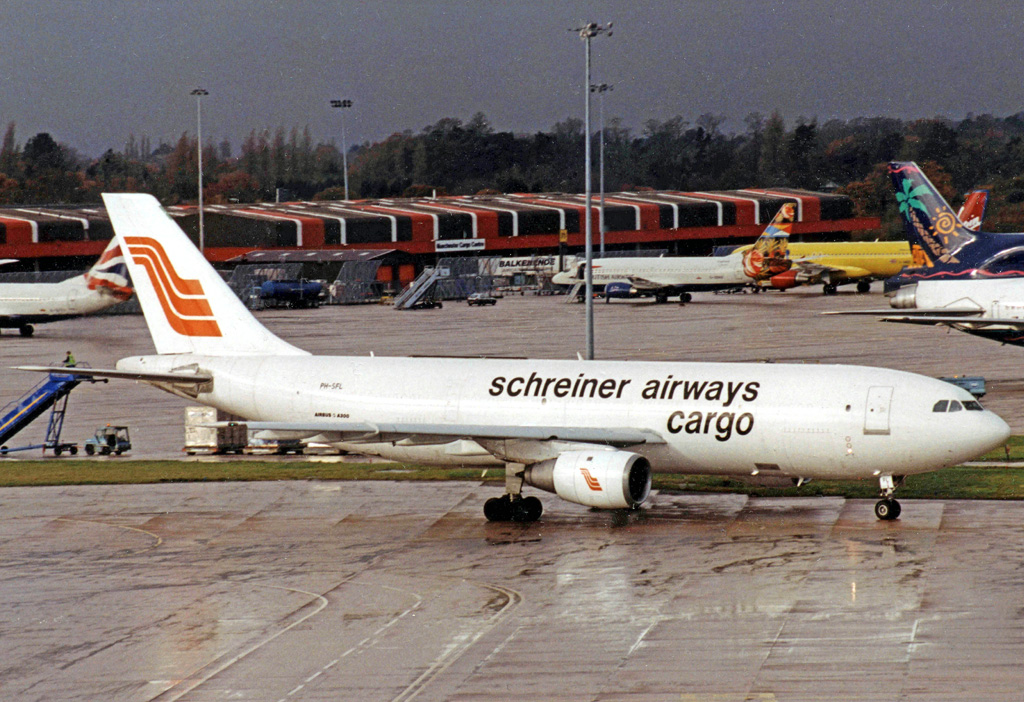
Schreiner Airways Cargo Airbus A300 at Manchester Airport in 2000.

The Schreiner group established a dedicated cargo operation in 1997 and leased a Lockheed C-130 Hercules freighter which operated cargo services for KLM Royal Dutch Airlines. The aircraft was returned to its owner in 1998. Three Airbus A300 jet freighters were acquired and flown for KLM on cargo services between 1999 and 2001, when this operation was terminated.

== Code data ==
- IATA Code: AW
- ICAO Code: SCH
- Callsign: SCHREINER

== Fleet ==
As of August 2006 the Schreiner Airways fleet included:

- 2 ATR 72-200
- 4 Bombardier Dash 8 Q300
- 5 De Havilland Canada DHC-6 Twin Otter Series 300

=== Historical fleet ===
It had a fairly large fleet of aircraft comprising since the ‘90s mainly of DeHavilland Canada DHC8-102/311 and ATR 72-210 in passenger configuration on behalf of SABENA. In the late ‘90 cargo operations were started, operating initially a single L100-382 Hercules briefly. From 1999 until 2001 the L100 was replaced by 3 Airbus A300-B4 freighters operating on behalf of KLM. and TNT Cargo.

== Preserved Schreiner Airways aircraft ==
At the Aviodrome aviation museum on Lelystad Airport a retired Aérospatiale Dauphin 2 helicopter in Schreiner colors is on display.

== Bibliography ==
- Gradidge, Jennifer. Douglas DC-1, DC-2, DC-3 - The First Seventy Years, Volume 1. Air-Britain (Historians) Ltd. Tonbridge, Kent. 2006. ISBN 0-85130-332-3.
- Roach, J and Eastwood A.B. Piston Engined Airliner Production List. The Aviation Hobby Shop. West Drayton, Middlesex. 2007. No ISBN.
