= Babcock Mission Critical Services Australasia =

- Type: Private
- Industry: Airline
- Founded: 1990
- Headquarters: Adelaide, South Australia, Australia
- Key people: Andrew Cridland, CEO
- Parent: Babcock International

Babcock Mission Critical Services Australasia, formerly Australian Helicopters, is an Australian helicopter operator serving the Government, EMS, Transport & Television markets. Operating a mix of light and medium turbine-engined helicopters, it performs helicopter transport and air work for a number of private and government clients across Queensland and South Australia. The company is a subsidiary of Babcock International.

== History ==
The airline was established in 1990 as Reef Helicopters. In 2003, Reef Helicopters merged with Marine Helicopters. In 2004, the company was rebranded to Australian Helicopters. The business has steadily grown and in June 2010, employed 137 staff across 8 bases from Adelaide to the Torres Strait.

== Clients ==
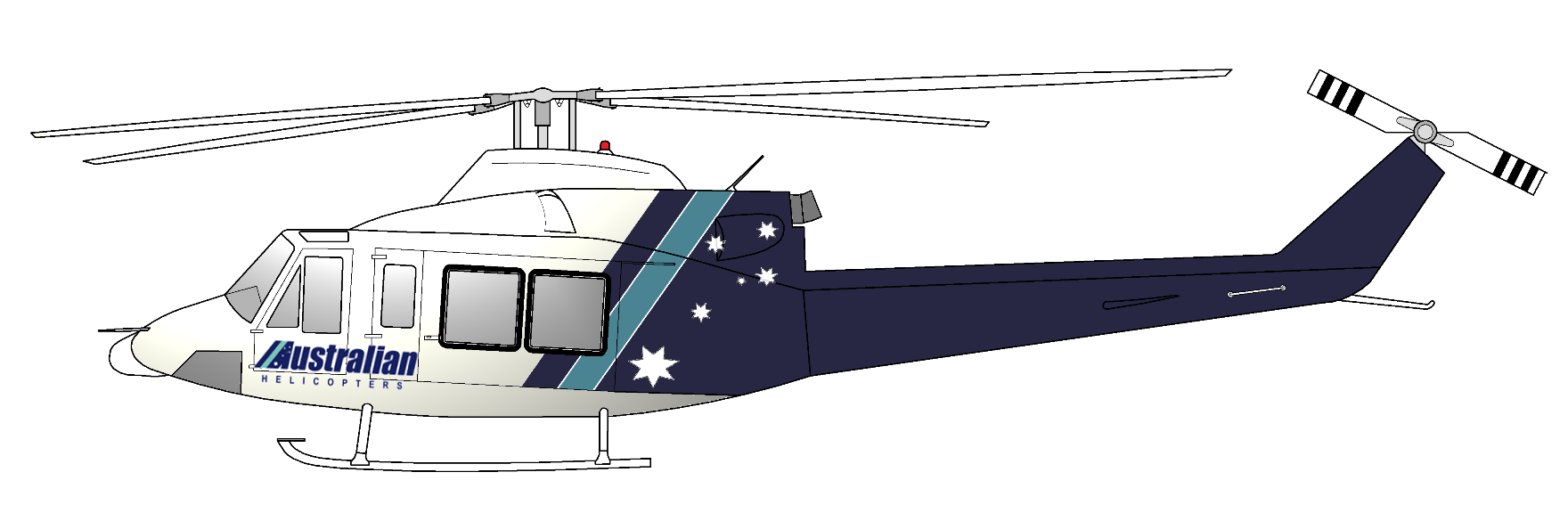
Australian Helicopters Bell 412

BMCS operates on behalf of the following organisations:

- Queensland Ambulance Service – Torres Strait Ambulance (EMS)
- Australian Customs Service (Transport & Surveillance)
- Victorian Helicopter Emergency Medical Service (HEMS)
- South Australian State Rescue Helicopter Service (EMS)
- Australian Defence Force (SAR & Training)
- RACQ Capricorn Helicopter Rescue Service (EMS)
- RACQ CQ Helicopter Rescue Service Mackay (EMS)
- Port Authority of New South Wales (Marine pilot transfer)

== Fleet ==
As of November 2015, the BMCS fleet comprised

- 5 x AgustaWestland AW139 Series
- 8 x Agusta/Bell 412 Series
- 4 x Eurocopter AS350 Series
- 1 x Eurocopter EC130 Series
- 2 x MBB/Kawasaki BK 117 Series
- 2 x Hughes 369 Series
- 1 x Bell 206 Series
