= Canadian Helicopters =

Canadian air service company

Canadian Helicopters Limited

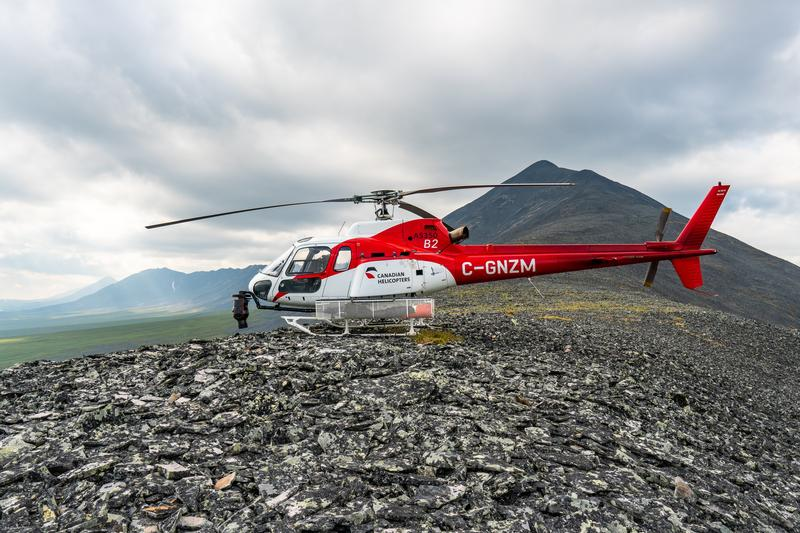
- Porcupine Caribou herd filming project in the Richardson Ranges - Inuvik, NT (2019)
IATA	ICAO	Call sign
—	CDN (Note: Not official)	CANADIAN
- Founded: Okanagan Helicopters (1947)
- Commenced operations: St. John's, Newfoundland (1987)
- AOC #: Quebec: 11988
- Operating bases: AB, BC, MB, NB, NL, NT, NS, NU, QC
- Fleet size: 86
- Headquarters: Les Cèdres, Quebec, Canada
- Website: www.canadianhelicopters.com

Canadian Helicopters Limited, formerly a part of the Canadian operations of CHC Helicopter Corporation, operates 88 aircraft from 22 bases across Canada and provides a broad range of helicopter services to support the following activities: emergency medical evacuation; infrastructure maintenance; utilities; oil and gas; forestry; mining; construction; and air transportation. Canadian Helicopters also operates an advanced flight school; provides third party repair and maintenance services; and provides helicopter services in the United States in support of specialty operations including forest fire suppression activities and geophysical exploration programs.

== History ==
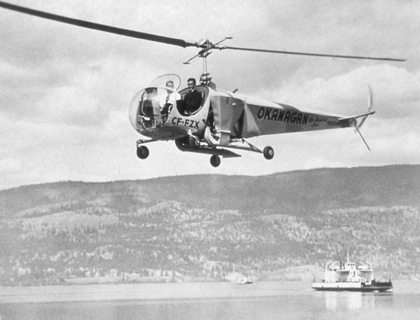

Commercial helicopter flying began in British Columbia in the summer of 1947. Three former Royal Canadian Air Force officers, pilots Carl Agar and Barney Bent, and engineer Alf Stringer, were operating a fixed-wing charter company, Okanagan Air Services, out of Penticton. In July 1947 they raised enough money to purchase a Bell 47-B3 and pay for their flying and maintenance training.

Okanagan Air Services moved to Vancouver in 1949, was renamed Okanagan Helicopters and, by 1954, had become the largest commercial helicopter operator in the world.

Toronto Helicopters was founded by Len Routledge and Douglas Dunlop. It was a pioneer in air ambulance services in Ontario and operated helicopters for the Ontario Ministry of Health.

Sealand Helicopters was founded by Newfoundland and Labrador businessman Craig Dobbin in February 1977.

In 1987, Dobbin headed a group that purchased Okanagan Helicopters and Toronto Helicopters and merged them with his own company, Sealand Helicopters to form Canadian Helicopters.

Until November 2000, Canadian Helicopters was the domestic operating arm of Canadian Helicopters International, a wholly owned subsidiary of CHC Helicopter. In 2000, Canadian Helicopters was divested by way of a management buy-out. The company continued operations as Canadian Helicopters until it was renamed HNZ Group after acquiring that company.

Starting in the first quarter of 2009 Canadian Helicopters Ltd. began providing intergovernmental support in Afghanistan. On October 1, 2010, the company announced a contract with United States Transportation Command for flying operations of two Sikorsky S61 and four Bell 212 helicopters, bringing their total contracted to 11 in Afghanistan. Although painted in white and blue livery, these were civilian specification aircraft. With the increased flying tempo, the company acquired crew body armor for dangerous environments and during hostile conditions.

In December 2017, the company was taken private as Canadian Helicopters Limited.

As of January 27, 2026, Canadian Helicopters Limited has an air operator's certificate, 11988, in Les Cèdres, Quebec.

== Bases ==
As of January 27, 2026, the following are bases in Canada:

Province / territory	City	Airport	Notes
Alberta	Edmonton	Edmonton International Airport	Executive office
Alberta	Fort McMurray	Fort McMurray International Airport	
Alberta	Grande Prairie	Grande Prairie Airport	
British Columbia	Fort St. John	Fort St. John Airport	
British Columbia	Penticton	Penticton Regional Airport	Flight school
British Columbia	Smithers	Smithers Airport	
British Columbia	Terrace	Northwest Regional Airport Terrace-Kitimat	
Manitoba	Portage la Prairie	Portage la Prairie/Southport Airport	Department of National Defence training and maintenance support, KF Defence Programs (Allied Wings)
New Brunswick	Fredericton	Fredericton International Airport	
Newfoundland and Labrador	Bishop's Falls		
Newfoundland and Labrador	Goose Bay	Goose Bay Airport	
Newfoundland and Labrador	Pasadena		
Northwest Territories	Inuvik	Inuvik (Mike Zubko) Airport	
Northwest Territories	Norman Wells	Norman Wells Airport	
Northwest Territories	Yellowknife	Yellowknife Airport	Acasta HeliFlight
Nova Scotia	Halifax	Halifax Stanfield International Airport	Emergency medical services
Nunavut	Cambridge Bay	Cambridge Bay Airport	
Nunavut	Iqaluit	Iqaluit Airport	
Nunavut	Sanirajak	Sanirajak Airport	Previously known as Hall Beach
Quebec	Montreal	Montréal/Les Cèdres Heliport	Corporate head office, heliport operated by Canadian Helicopters
Quebec	Radisson	La Grande Rivière Airport	Robert-Bourassa generating station, Whapchiwem Canadian Helicopters
Quebec	Sept-Îles	Sept-Îles Airport	

== Heliports ==
As of January 27, 2026, Canadian Helicopters Limited operates the following heliports:

- Montréal/Les Cèdres Heliport, Montreal, Quebec
- Sagard Heliport, Sagard, Quebec
- Smithers (Canadian) Heliport, Smithers, British Columbia

== Fleet ==
As of January 27, 2026, Transport Canada listed the following helicopter fleet as being registered to Canadian Helicopters Limited - Hélicoptères Canadiens Limitée of Quebec:

Canadian Helicopters fleet
Aircraft	No. of aircraft	Variants	Notes
Aerospatiale AS 355	7	AS 355-N	Twin engine, listed at Canadian Helicopters as an Airbus, 4 passengers
Bell 206	1	LongRanger	Single engine, 6 passengers, not listed at Canadian Helicopters site
Bell 212	8	-	Twin engine, 14 passengers
Bell 407	6	-	Single engine, 6 passengers
Bell 412	3	412EP	Twin engine, 14, passengers
Eurocopter AS350 Écureuil (Aerospatiale AS350)	49	34 - AS350 B2; 15 - AS350 B3	Single engine, listed at Canadian Helicopters as an Airbus, 5 passengers, an unknown number listed with Canadian Helicopters as AS350 B3e
Eurocopter EC120	4	EC120B Colibri	Single engine, listed at Canadian Helicopters as an Airbus, 4 passengers
Eurocopter EC135	1	EC135 T2+	Twin engine, listed at Canadian Helicopters as an Airbus, 6 passengers
Sikorsky S-61	3	S-61N	Twin engine, 26 passengers
Sikorsky S-76	4	1 - S-76A; 2 - S-76C; 1 - S-76D	Twin engine, listed at Canadian Helicopters as S-76A++ (9 passengers), S-76C+ (8 passengers) and S-76D (8 passengers)
Total	86		

== Gallery ==
Aircraft of Canadian Helicopters
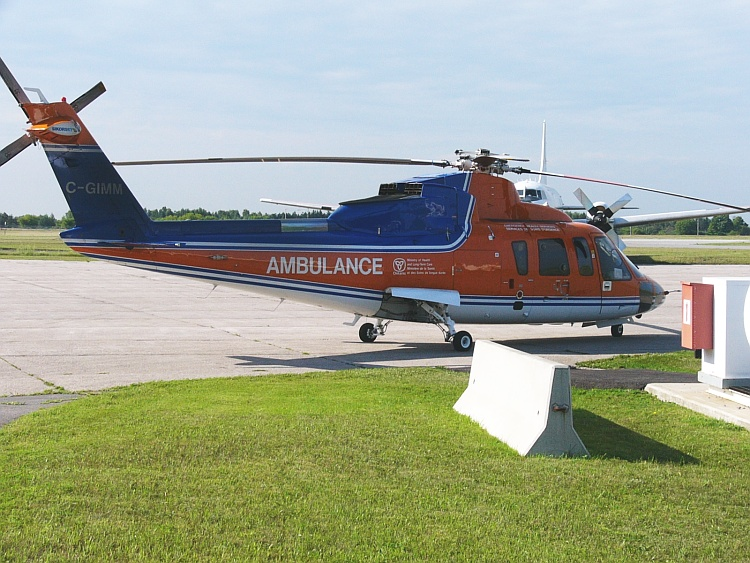
An early production Sikorsky S-76A used in the air ambulance role for the Ontario Ministry of Health

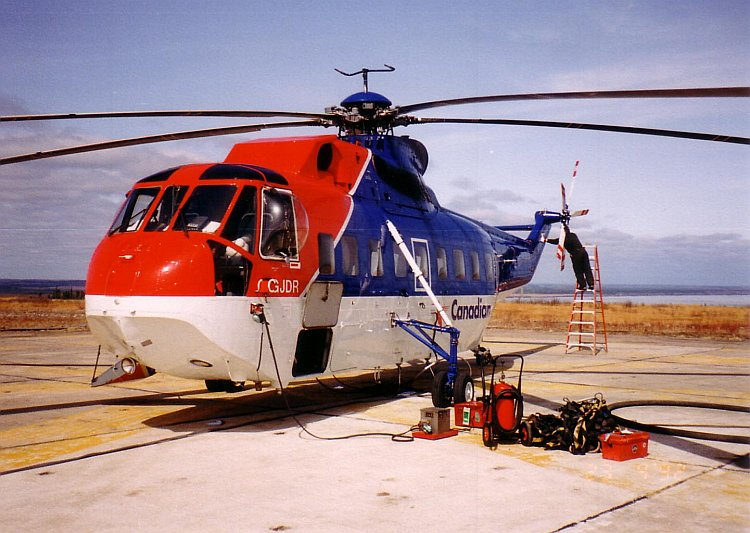
Sikorsky S-61

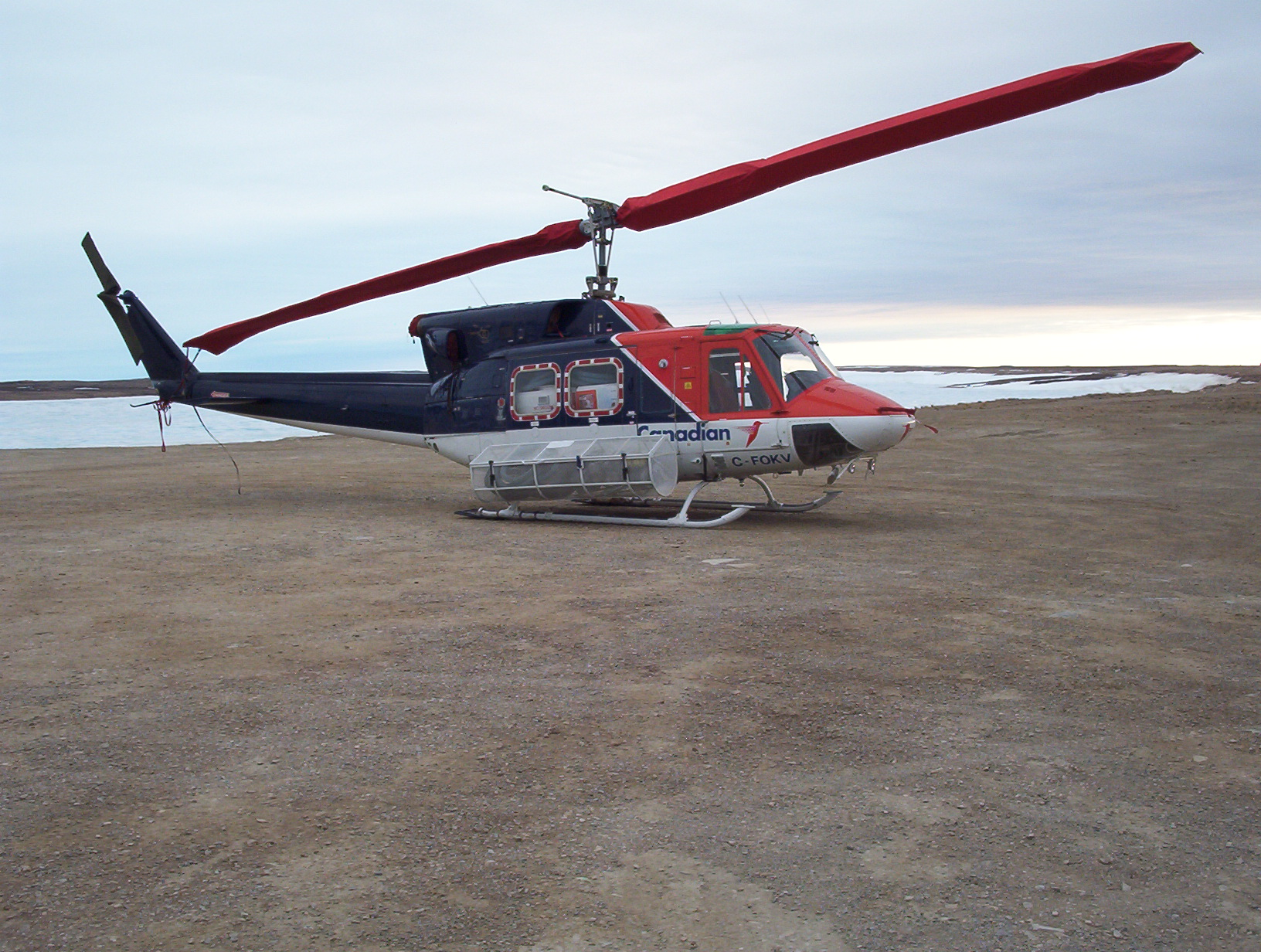
Bell 212 (C-FOKV) at Cambridge Bay Airport, Nunavut, Canada

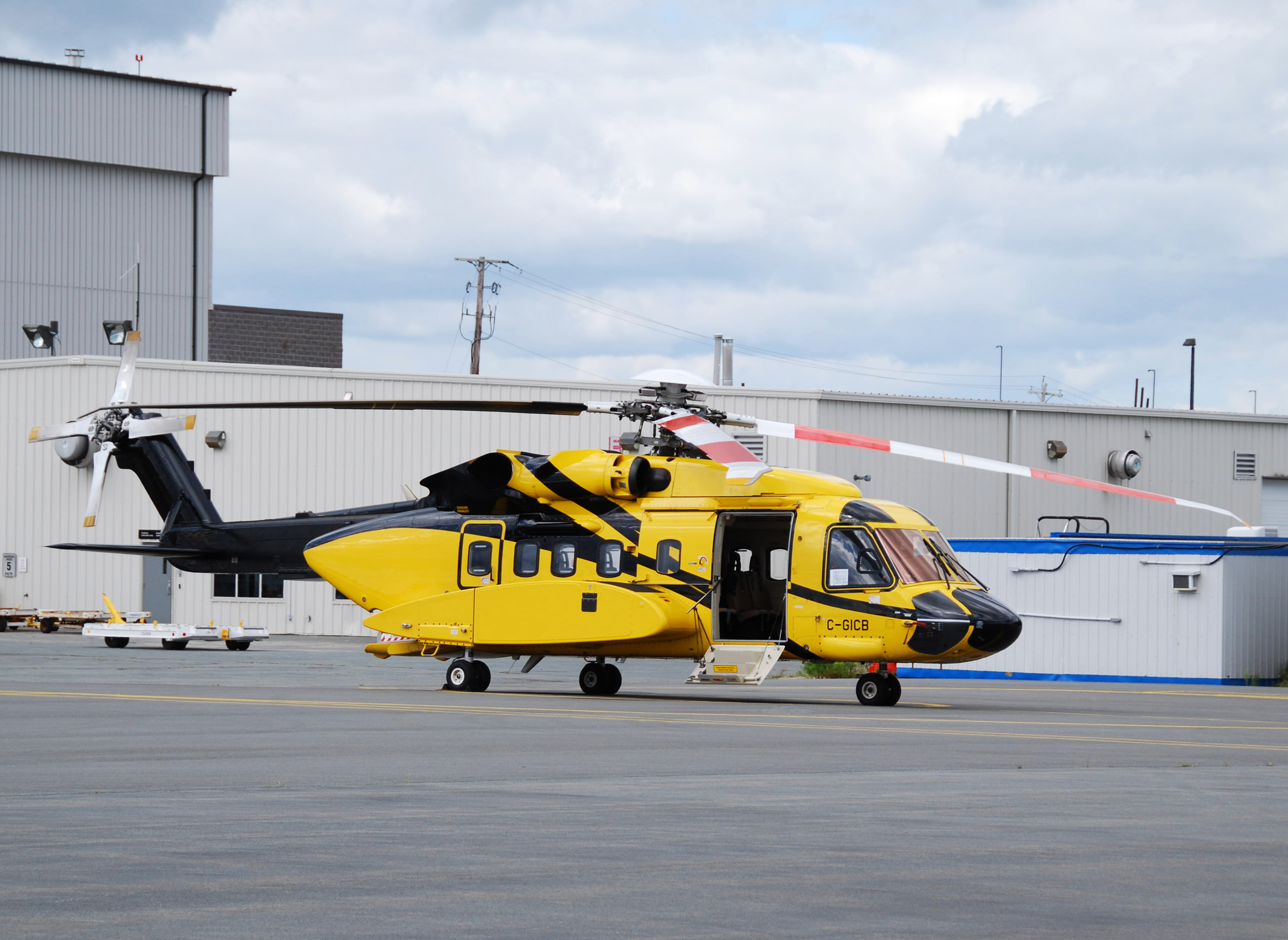
A Sikorsky S-92A at Halifax Stanfield International Airport

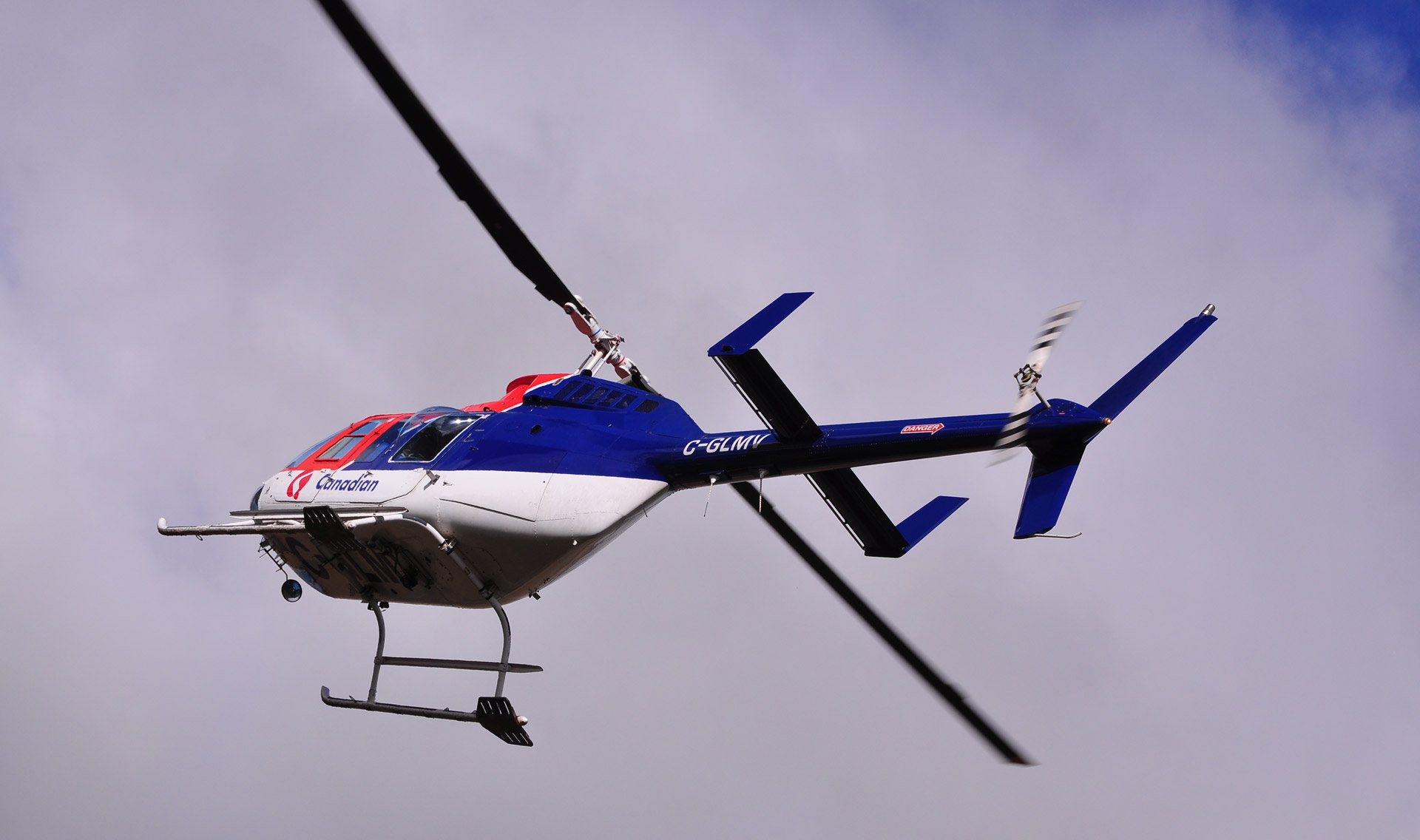
A Bell 206 JetRanger
