= De Kooy =

- Hamlet
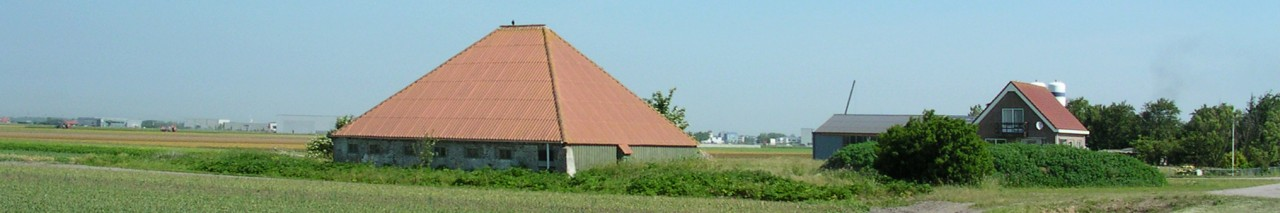
- Countryside around De Kooy

- Location within Netherlands Location within North Holland
- Coordinates: 52°54′52″N 4°47′9″E
- Country: Netherlands
- Province: North Holland
- Municipality: Den Helder

Area
  - Total: 2.27 km^{2} (0.88 sq mi)
- Elevation: 0.3 m (0.98 ft)

Population (2021)
  - Total: 45
  - Density: 20/km^{2} (51/sq mi)
- Time zone: UTC+1 (CET)
  - Summer (DST): UTC+2 (CEST)
- Postal code: 1786
- Dialing code: 0223

De Kooy is a hamlet in the Dutch province of North Holland. It is a part of the municipality of Den Helder, and lies about 5 kilometers (3.1 mi) south-east of the Den Helder city centre.

The hamlet is known for the nearby naval air field, De Kooy Airfield, which was constructed in 1918. It has no place name signs.
