= Hong Kong Air International =

Hong Kong aviation company

IATA	ICAO	Call sign
HI	N/A	Coptair
- Founded: 1971
- Ceased operations: 1976
- Fleet size: 5
- Headquarters: Hong Kong
- Key people: Maurice Holloway

Hong Kong Air International Ltd was founded in the 1970s to provide helicopter services in Hong Kong, such as scheduled flights, tourist flights, and external load lifting.

== History ==
The company was started by Maurice Holloway, as part of Hutchison (now Hutchison Whampoa), in 1971(?) and ceased trading in 1976.

== Fleet ==
VR-HGL Bell 212

VR-HGT Aérospatiale AS-350 Ecureuil

VR-HGX Aérospatiale Alouette II - as seen in the movie Cleopatra Jones and the Casino of Gold

VR-HGM Bell Helicopters Bell 47

VR-HCK ? Aérospatiale Alouette 3
