= Sealand Helicopters =

Canadian helicopter company

- Company type: Private
- Industry: Transportation
- Founded: St. John's, Newfoundland (1977)
- Founder: Craig Dobbin
- Defunct: 1988
- Successor: CHC Helicopter
- Headquarters: St. John's, Newfoundland
- Key people: Craig Dobbin, President and CEO
- Products: Helicopter services
- Revenue: Not reported

Sealand Helicopters was a helicopter services company, specializing in transportation to offshore oil and gas platforms.

== History ==
The company was founded by industrialist Craig Dobbin in February 1977 in St. John's, Newfoundland as a charter airline. Its headquarters were at St. John's International Airport. The company first entered the offshore transport industry in 1979, providing helicopters mainly in support of offshore oil and gas operations. By the early 1980s, Sealand operated a fleet of over 30 helicopters.

In 1987, Dobbin headed a group of investors organized under the name Canadian Holding Company which purchased Okanagan Helicopters, Viking Helicopters, and Toronto Helicopters and merged them with Sealand Helicopters, to form CHC Helicopter.

== Fleet ==
- 12 - Bell 206B
- 8 - Aérospatiale AS 332
- 5 - Bell 206L
- 3 - Aérospatiale AS 355
- 2 - Sikorsky S-76A
- 1 - Aérospatiale AS 350
- 1 - Bell 205
- 1 - Bell 47
- 1 - Messerschmitt Bo 105
- 1 - Sud Aviation SA 330J

== See also ==
- List of defunct airlines of Canada

== Gallery ==
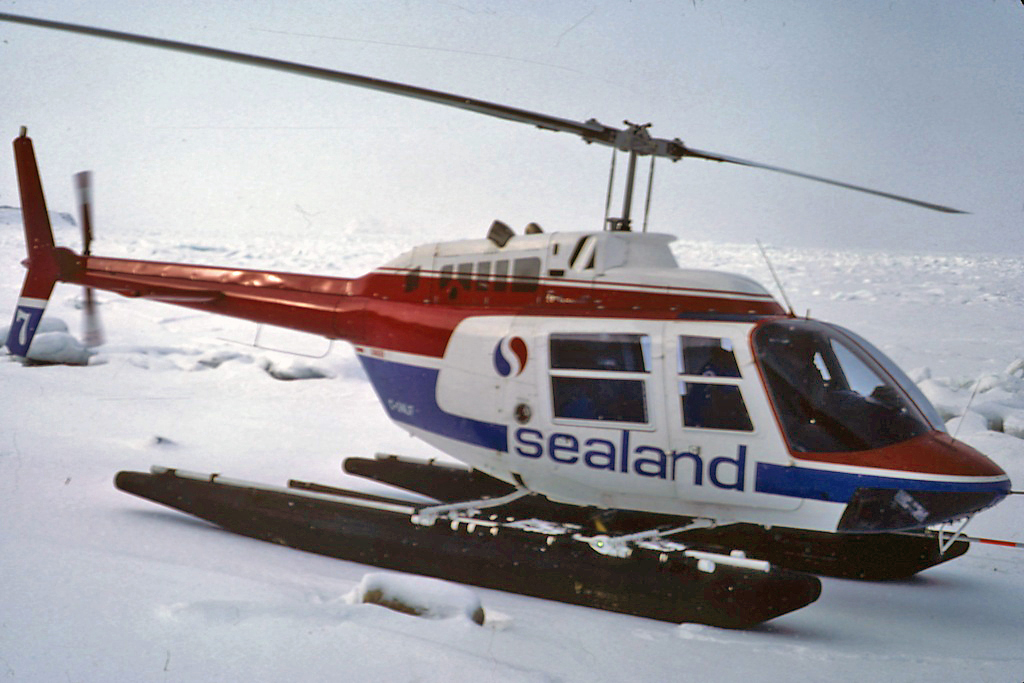
Bell 206

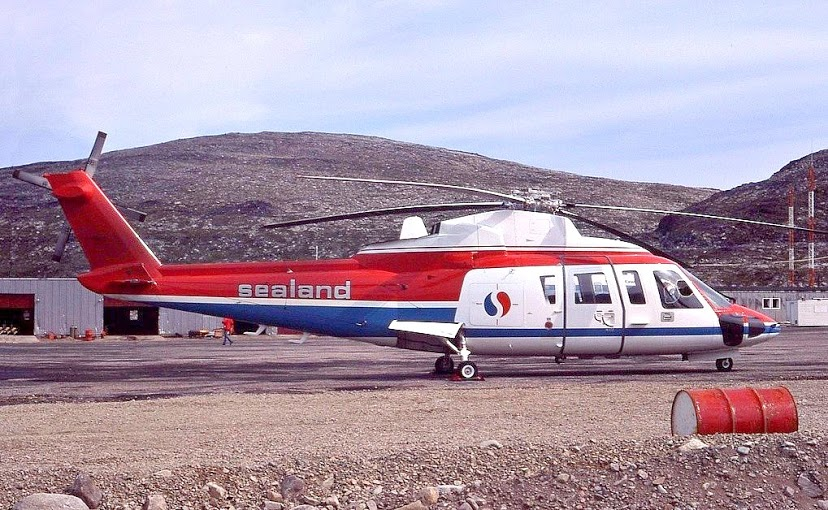
Sikorsky S76-A
