= HNZ Group =

HNZ Group Inc
- Company type: Private
- Industry: Transportation
- Predecessor: Sealand Helicopters & Okanagan Helicopters
- Headquarters: Les Cèdres, Quebec, Canada
- Area served: Canada, Australia, New Zealand, Afghanistan, Antarctica and southeast Asia
- Key people: Don Wall (President and CEO)
- Services: Helicopter charter and related services
- Revenue: $265 million CAN (2011)
- Website: www.canadianhelicopters.com

HNZ Group Inc, now Canadian Helicopters Limited, operated 140 helicopters in support of multi-national companies and government agencies, including onshore and offshore oil & gas, mineral exploration, military support, hydro/utilities, forest management, construction, air ambulance, and search & rescue. In addition to charter services, it provided flight training and third party repair and maintenance services from 43 bases across Canada, Australia, New Zealand, Afghanistan, United States, Antarctica and southeast Asia.

== History ==
Until November 2000, Canadian Helicopters was the domestic operating arm of Canadian Helicopters International, a wholly owned subsidiary of CHC Helicopter Corporation. In 2000, CHI entered into an agreement with Fonds de Solidarité FTQ (FSTQ) and the management of its two domestic divisions, Canadian Helicopters Eastern and Canadian Helicopters Western, for the sale of an interest in the divisions' assets in a management buyout. As a result, the senior management and FSTQ acquired 10% and 45% equity interests in Canadian Helicopters, respectively, while CHC retained a 45% equity interest. The management buyout was completed in November 2000 at which time the management team integrated the eastern and western operations to form Canadian Helicopters Limited.

The company went public on the TSX in 2005 at which time CHC Helicopter Corporation divested itself of its equity interest and holds no interest in the company to this day. In 2011, Canadian Helicopters Group Inc. purchased Helicopters New Zealand (HNZ) for NZ$154 million, and in 2012 changed the name of the combined company to HNZ Group Inc. On December 29, 2017, CHL Heli, a company beneficially wholly owned by Don Wall (HNZ's President and CEO), acquired ownership and control of all of the common shares and variable voting shares of HNZ Group Inc. pursuant to a statutory plan of arrangement under section 192 of the Canada Business Corporations Act. In connection with the completion of the arrangement, CHL Heli amalgamated with HNZ Group Inc. to form Canadian Helicopters Limited. HNZ Group Inc's shares were delisted from the Toronto Stock Exchange on January 3, 2018.
