= CHC Helicopter =

Helicopter services company

- Type: Privately held company
- Industry: Transportation
- Predecessor: Sealand Helicopters; Okanagan Air Services; Toronto Helicopters; Viking Helicopters
- Founded: St. John's, Newfoundland (1987)
- Founder: Craig Dobbin
- Successor: Canadian Helicopters (Canadian operations only)
- Headquarters: Irving, Texas
- Area served: Worldwide
- Key people: Tom Burke (CEO); Neil Gilchrist (CFO)
- Services: Helicopter services
- Revenue: ▼US$1.70 billion (2015)
- Number of employees: 4,500 (2014)
- Subsidiaries: Heli-One
- Website: chcheli.com

CHC Helicopter is a multinational corporation helicopter services company headquartered in Irving, Texas, and incorporated in Newfoundland and Labrador.

CHC Helicopter maintains its global headquarters in Irving, Texas and operates with 109 aircraft in over 10 countries across four continents. CHC's major international operating units are based in Australia, Brazil, the Netherlands, Norway, and the United Kingdom. The company is one of several global providers of helicopter transportation services to the offshore oil and gas industry (others including Bristow Helicopters and NHV).

CHC provides helicopter services to the offshore energy markets, search and rescue operations, and government departments, as well as organizations requiring helicopter maintenance, repair, and overhaul services through its Heli-One division.

== History ==
=== Origins ===
The origins of CHC Helicopter can be traced back to the start of commercial helicopter operations in British Columbia. Following the end of the Second World War, two former Royal Canadian Air Force (RCAF) instructors, Carl Agar and Barney Bent, aspired to continue flying aircraft and chose to form their own flight training club, the South Okanagan Flying Club, in Penticton using a handful of de Havilland Tiger Moths. Shortly thereafter, Carl and Barney partnered with ex-RCAF engineer Alf Stringer to join the group. However, as there was not much demand for private pilot training at the time, the three men chose to relocate the business to Kelowna and rebranded it as Okanagan Air Services Ltd.

Early on, Okanagan Air Services operated only fixed-wing aircraft, such as a pair of Cessna 140s, to perform charter and training flights. Agar became interested in the potential of the newly emerging helicopter and of its potential application to the commercial market; the three men travelled to Yakima to attend a demonstration of the Bell 47, the first commercially certified helicopter. Upon their return, they immediately set about securing backers from which to finance their expansion into rotorcraft. In July 1947, the company was able to raise sufficient finance to purchase its own Bell 47-B3 helicopter, CF-FZX, as well as to funding training on both its maintenance and piloting. Upon its delivery on 9 August 1947, it was the first commercially licensed helicopter in British Columbia.

The company's initial use of its helicopter largely revolved around crop dusting; on 1 September 1947, CF-FZX was damaged after striking powerlines, but was repaired after several months. While it became clear that small-scale crop dusting was not economic with the type, insect spraying was more lucrative however. Agar's flying skills proved valuable during mountain flying in support of government topographic survey efforts; this pioneering use of a helicopter led to Agar being awarded the Trans-Canada Trophy in 1950 and gain valuable publicity for the company. Further mountain survey flights led to Okanagan receiving contracts from companies like Aluminum Company of Canada Ltd to support remote construction projects and to transport personnel or equipment to and from the wilderness. Even so, the company remained unprofitable for its first few years.

=== Expansion ===
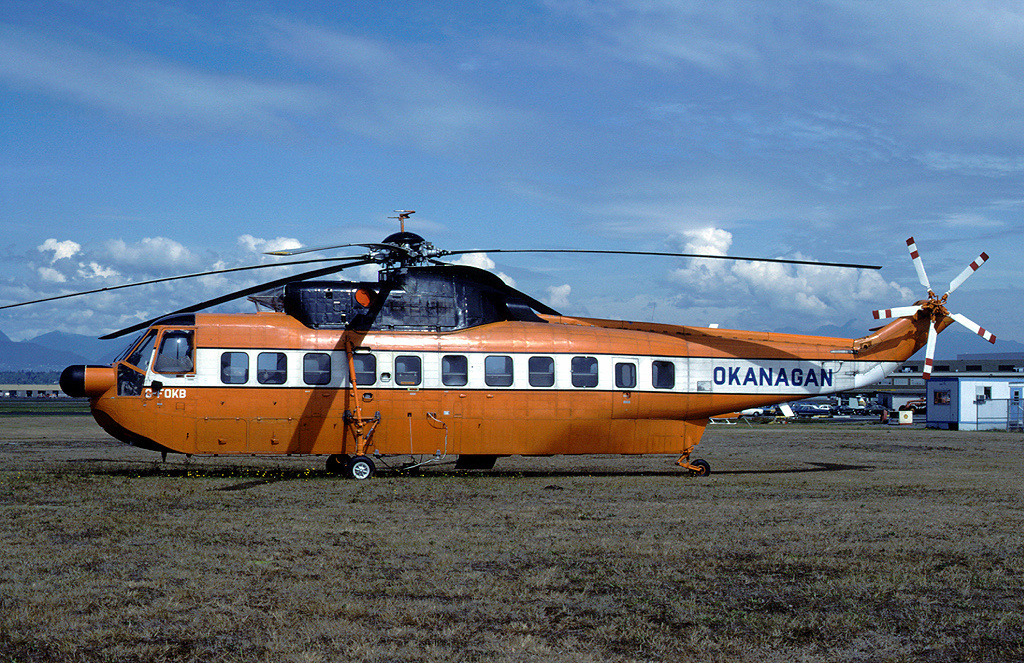
A Sikorsky S-61 in Okanagan Helicopters livery

During the early 1950s, the company officially renamed itself Okanagan Helicopters Ltd. By the end of 1952, it had become the largest commercial helicopter operator in North America and one of the largest in the world. Throughout much of the 1950s, Okanagan participated in the construction and maintenance of the Mid-Canada Line of radar stations, using a mixed fleet of Sikorsky S-55 and Bell 47s. By the end of 1958, the firm was operating a fleet of 51 rotorcraft at various locations all across Canada. In the 1960s, Okanagan continued to grow into new locations and new markets, retaining a heavy focus on remote construction projects. During 1963, it received its first overseas contract from East Pakistan, which it met via a single Bell 47J.

The 1970s was a period of transformation for Okanagan. Only Bent remained on staff by this point as both Agar and Stringer had resigned during the 1960s over disputes on how the company ought to be run. Okanagan embarked on a spree of acquisitions, purchasing companies such as Universal Helicopters, Haida Helicopters, Lac Saint-Jean Aviation, Dominion-Pegasus Helicopters, Sept-Iles Helicopter Services, Associated Helicopters and Bow Helicopter. By 1975, 20 percent of the company's revenue came from international sources; a dedicated international division was established to manage this business sector. Furthermore, as a result of the turboshaft engine having displaced the piston engine on newer and more capable helicopters, Okanagan began to introduce turbine-powered rotorcraft into its fleet, including the Bell 204, Bell 212, Sikorsky S-58T, Sikorsky S-62, and Sikorsky S-76.

By 1981, Okanagan was the largest helicopter company in Canada, operating a fleet of 125 helicopters, along with 900 employees and annual revenues of $83 million Cdn. The company attracted the attention of various investors, leading to a takeover by Canadian oil company Resource Service Group; soon thereafter, Alan Bristow, the founder of Britain's Bristow Helicopters, acquired a 49 percent ownership stake in the company.

=== CHC era ===
In 1987, Newfoundland businessman Craig Dobbin headed a group of investors organized under the name Canadian Holding Company, commonly using the initialism CHC. CHC purchased Okanagan Helicopters, along with Viking Helicopters, and Toronto Helicopters; all three merged their assets with Dobbin's own company, Sealand Helicopters, to form a new company, initially branded Canadian Helicopters, while the parent company was renamed CHC Helicopter Corporation. The new entity placed a great priority upon merger and acquisition opportunities, in addition to forming strategic partnerships, that would allow it to enter new or lightly served regions, such as South America.

During the 1990s and 2000s, CHC continued to acquire various other operators, including British International Helicopters in 1994; Helicopter Services Group of Norway in 1999 (including Bond Helicopters), Helikopter Service AS, Lloyd Helicopters of Australia and Court Helicopters of South Africa. In 2004, CHC purchased Schreiner Aviation Group, which specialized in provided offshore helicopter services in the Dutch sector of the North Sea and to the Nigerian offshore industry. In 2000, CHC agreed with Fonds de Solidarité FTQ (FSTQ) and the management of its two Canadian divisions, Canadian Helicopters Eastern and Canadian Helicopters Western, to sell an interest in CHC's Canadian assets via a management buyout to form Canadian Helicopters; consequently, senior management and FSTQ acquired 10% and 45% equity interests in Canadian Helicopters, respectively, while CHC retained a 45% equity interest.

During 2004, CHC decided to reorganize its operations into two principal divisions; Helicopter Services became responsible for the firm's global operations, while Heli-One functions as the world's largest independent provider of helicopter maintenance, repair, and overhaul services. As part of the restructuring, the company relocated its corporate headquarters from St. John's, Newfoundland and Labrador to Richmond, British Columbia.

In late February 2008, all of CHC's shares were purchased by First Reserve, a US private equity company, for CAD$3.7 billion ($3.5 billion), following the latter's uninvited offer. Around this same time period, the word "Corporation" was dropped from the company's name, having been formally rebranded as CHC Helicopter. In January 2014, the company announced its intention to raise up to $529 million through an initial public offering, the proceeds of which it mainly intended to use to paydown its outstanding debts. On January 16, 2014, CHC announced an initial public offering of 31,000,000 shares at a price of $10 per share.

On January 15, 2016, CHC offered 31,000,000 shares at US$5.17. On February 1, 2016 the New York Stock Exchange delisted the CHC's ordinary shares, pursuant to Section 802.01B of the NYSE's Listed Company Manual requiring NYSE-listed companies to maintain an average market capitalization of $15 million or more over the preceding thirty trading days. The NYSE also suspended trading of the Company's ordinary shares effective immediately. On May 5, 2016, the company filed for Chapter 11 Bankruptcy. CHC's bankruptcy was attributed to recent drops in the price of oil having negatively impacted revenue, making it unable to service the company's high burden of debt; other helicopter operators were also reported to be struggling under the prevailing economic conditions of the period as well. Reflecting the company's drop in performance, CHC's share value dropped from US$176.10 on November 17, 2014 to US$0.45 by June 17, 2016. During July 2016, a Texas court allowed CHC to shed 65 helicopters from its financial obligations, the majority of its Eurocopter AS332 Super Puma fleet. On March 1, 2017, a reorganized CHC emerged, relaunching its brand and web presence. Key creditors took over majority ownership of the newly restructured company, but the deal froze out existing shareholders. In December 2019, a 18-month-long dispute between CHC and British union staff over pay was settled.

== CHC EMS and SAR services ==
=== United Kingdom ===
CHC provides crew change support services to the UK offshore energy industry from its bases in Aberdeen, Norwich, and Humberside. Long-standing O&G customers include Shell and Equinor. CHC also provides crew change services to the offshore wind industry, notably supporting the development of Dogger Bank Wind Farm, a joint venture between SSE Renewables, Equinor and Vårgrønn. When completed, this will be the largest offshore wind farm in the world.

CHC, as part of the Soteria SAR consortium was selected as the "Preferred Bidder" for a 25-year contract to provide a civilian Search and Rescue service throughout the United Kingdom. However, days before the contract was due to be signed in February 2011, the British Government halted the process after CHC disclosed that it had unauthorised access to commercially sensitive information. The Soteria SAR was cancelled and the contract was awarded to back to Bristow Helicopters, who had operated the coastguard helicopters from Stornoway Airport, Sumburgh Airport, RNAS Lee-on-Solent (HMS Daedalus) and RNAS Portland (HMS Osprey) during the time of the Royal Navy and the Royal Air Force operating their Westland Sea Kings, prior to the Soteria SAR being set up.

=== Australia ===
CHC is the largest provider of emergency medical helicopter services in Western Australia. CHC provides helicopter services in Australia for the Fire and Emergency Services Authority of Western Australia.

==== Military ====
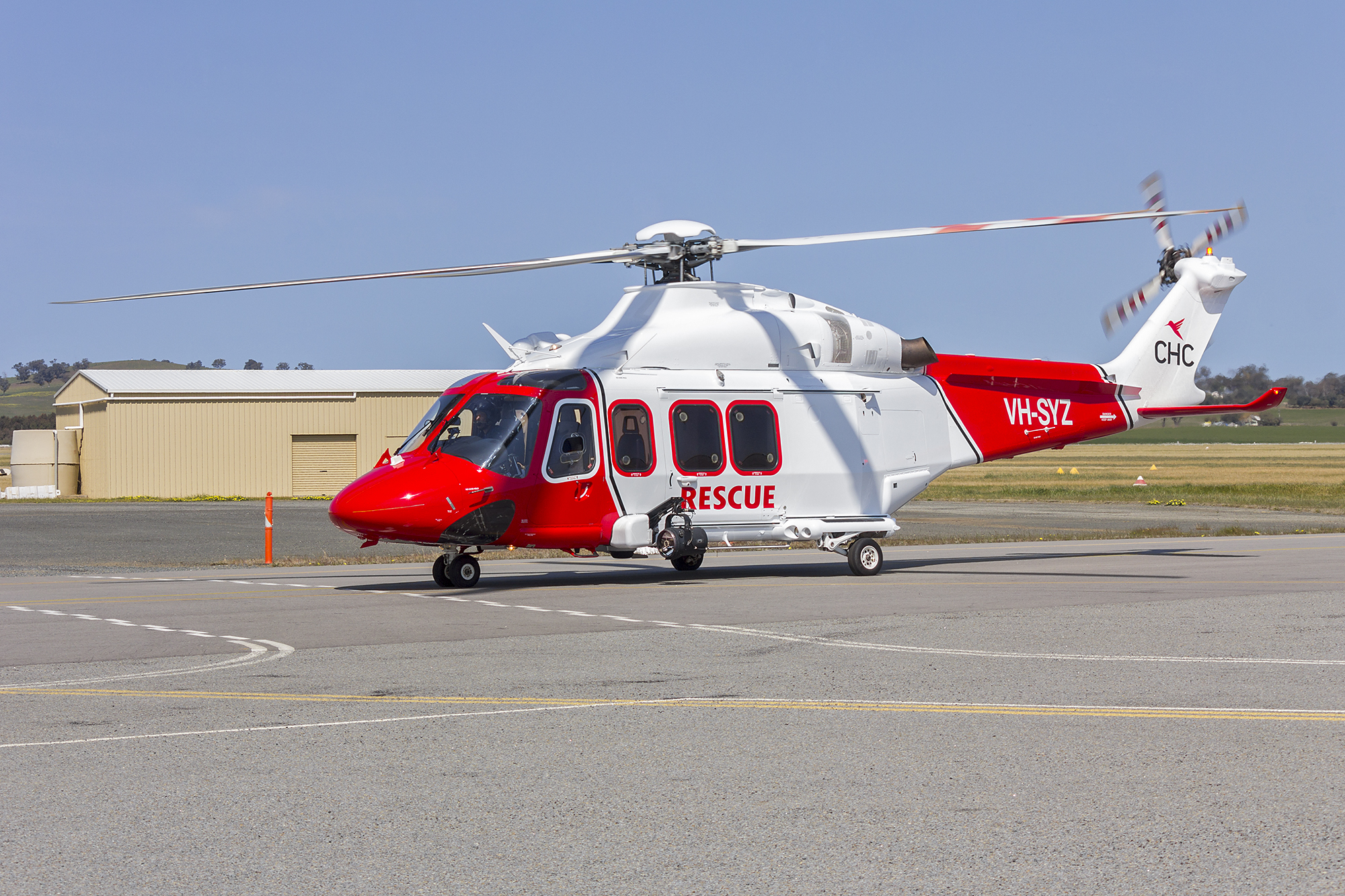
CHC Search and Rescue AW139

- Australian Army – CHC signed a 21-month contract in September 2016 to provide crash response support and aeromedical evacuation, operating its fleet of Sikorsky S76 and Bell 412 aircraft.
- Royal Australian Air Force – CHC has been providing dedicated rescue support to the RAAF since 1989 and operates six Leonardo AW139s. CHC operates at least 1 AW139 from every RAAF base that operates fast jets fitted with ejection seats.
- Royal Australian Navy – CHC began an interim 15-month contract in May 2017 to provide search and rescue, crash response support and aeromedical evacuation, operating its fleet of AW139 aircraft.

==== Police ====
- Victoria Police Air Wing – From 2002-2020, CHC provided three Eurocopter SA365N3 Dauphin helicopters, plus maintenance services, to the Victoria Police.

==== Ambulance ====
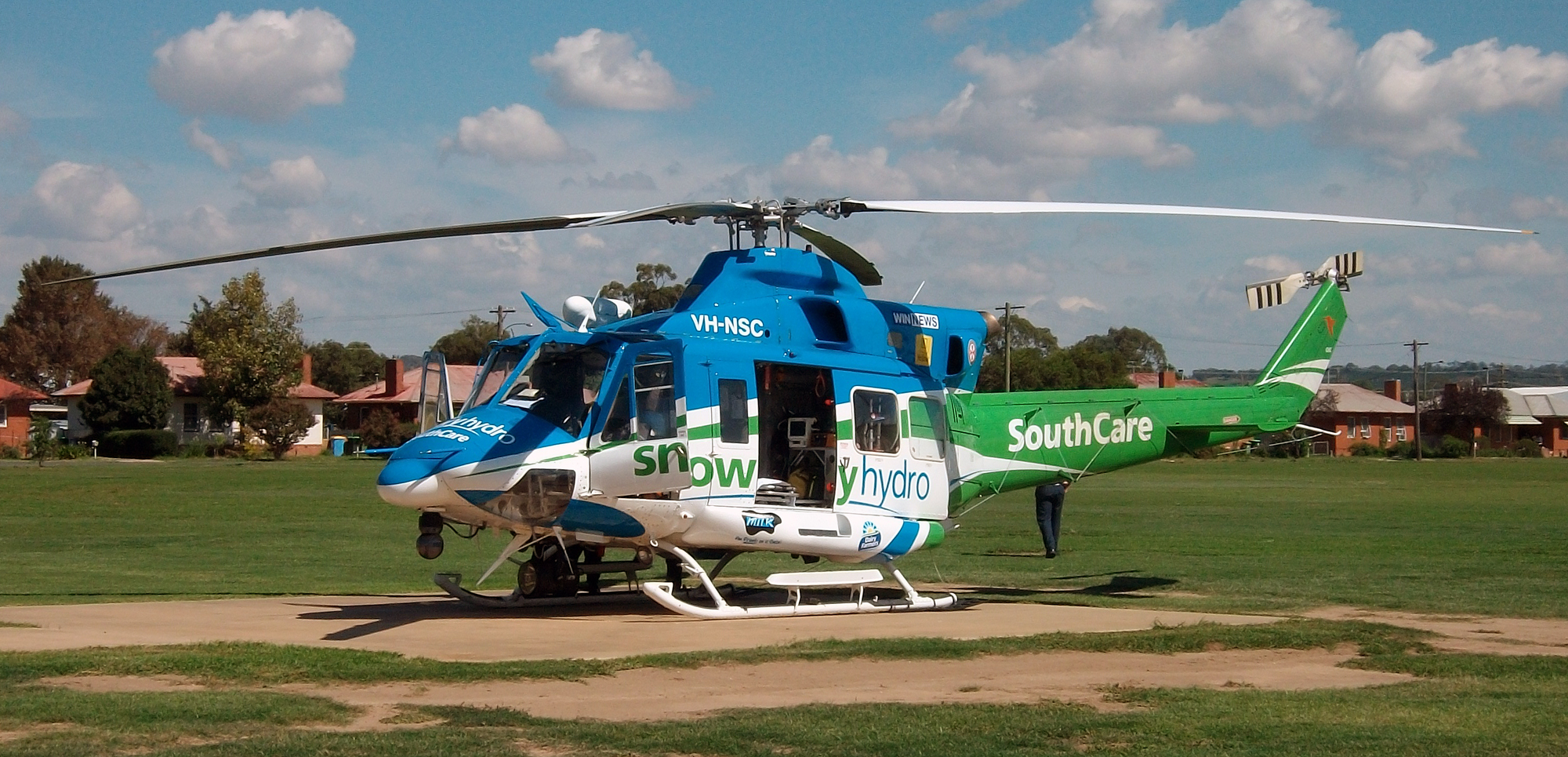
Snowy Hydro SouthCare Multi-purpose helicopter in 2010

- Fire and Emergency Services Authority of Western Australia – Based in Perth, WA, CHC provides a Bell 412 EP aircraft.
- Ambulance Victoria – Up until the end of 2015, CHC provided two Bell 412EP helicopters for Air Ambulance and Search and Rescue duties.
- Ambulance Service of New South Wales – CHC had provided up until 2017, three AW139s and two EC145 helicopters to supplement Ambulance NSW's eight contracted aeromedical helicopters. These were based at Wollongong, Sydney and Orange.
- Snowy Hydro SouthCare Air Ambulance Service – CHC had operated a Bell 412 for emergency helicopter service, based in Symonston, Australian Capital Territory.

=== Norway ===
==== North Sea ====
Norwegian Search and Rescue – CHC provides private Search and Rescue services in the Norwegian sector of the North Sea, but acts in concert with the Norwegian rescue coordination centres. The CHC SAR fleet includes two Super Puma L1 and three Super Puma EC 225.

Florø

==== Svalbard ====
From 1 April 2022 CHC provides private Search and Rescue services on Svalbard on behalf of the Governor of Svalbard.

==== Tromsø ====
From 1 April 2022 CHC provides private Search and Rescue services from a new SAR base in Tromsø.

=== Ireland ===
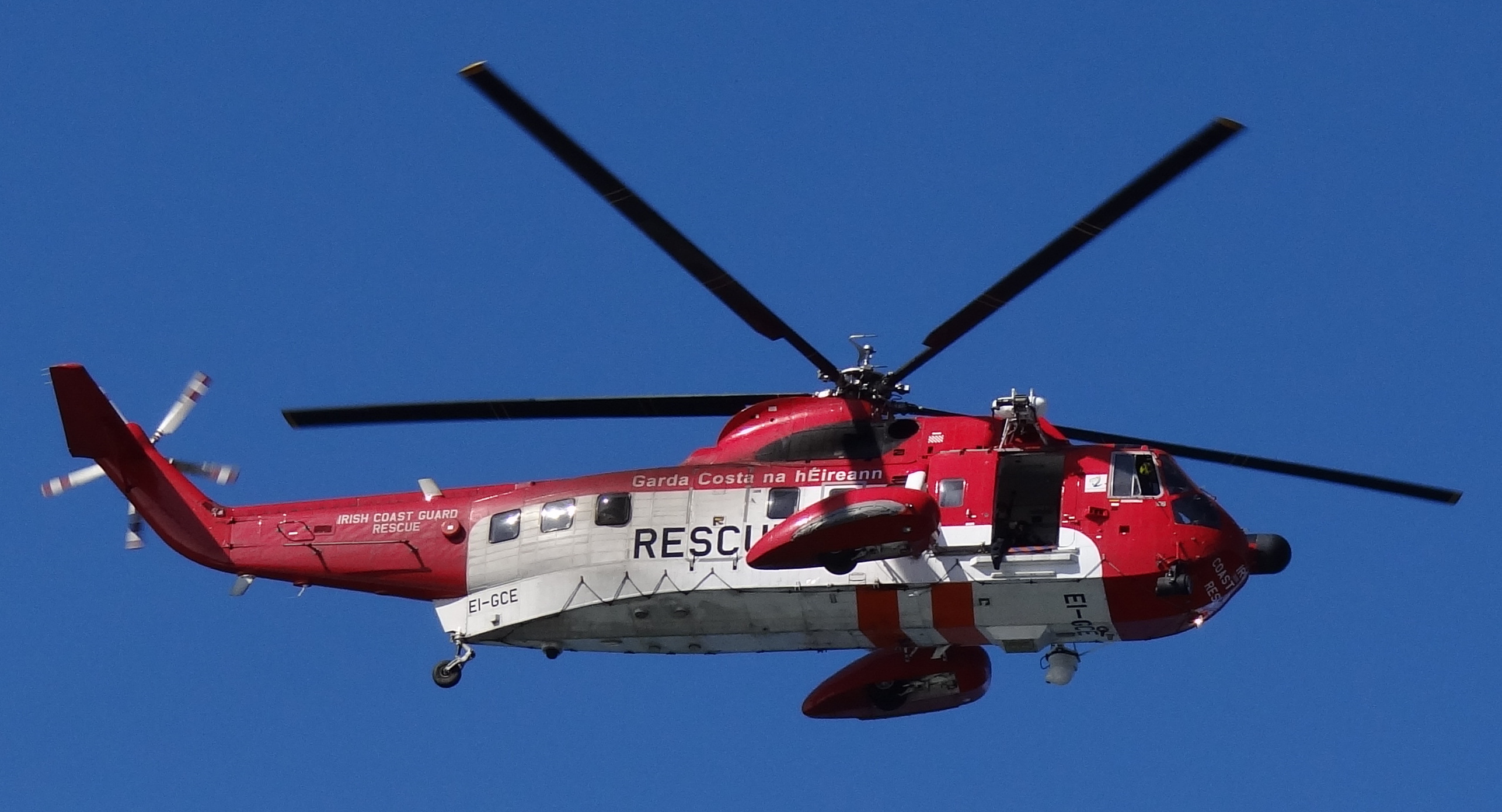
CHC S-61 operated for the Irish Coast Guard

From 2005 - 2025, CHC Helicopter served as the sole provider of Search and Rescue helicopter services to the Irish Coast Guard, where it had operated a fleet of six Sikorsky S-61N helicopters based in Dublin, Shannon, Waterford, and Sligo. This fleet has now been replaced by 5 Sikorsky S-92 Helibus. The S-61N exited service in December 2013 with a flight from Dublin Airport to Weston Aerodrome, West Dublin. The flight was operated by EI-SAR, the oldest S-61N in commercial operation at the time.

=== Other related services ===
- NH90: CHC is designing, manufacturing and installing 19 life-raft assembly kits for the NH90 helicopter, a new military search and rescue helicopter provided to the military of several European countries through a joint venture shared by Airbus Helicopters, Leonardo, and Fokker Aerostructures.
- Supply, rescue, and support Services: CHC provides extensive ship supply and rescue service off the coast of Africa and the Netherlands, and helicopter support services to scientific expeditions in Antarctica and other harsh environments.

== CHC and Heli-One Locations ==
Australia

Amberley, Bassendean, Broome, Bunbury, East Sale, Jandakot, Karratha, Nowra, Pearce, Perth, Tindal, Truscott, Williamtown

Brazil

Macae, Maricá, Rio de Janeiro, Jacarepagua, Cabo Frio, Farol de São Tomé

United Kingdom

Aberdeen, Norwich, Humberside

Canada

Borden, Richmond, Petawawa, River Road Delta, Valcartier, Trenton, Edmonton, Gagetown, Delta, St John's

Norway

Sola (Stavanger),|Svalbard, Bronnoysund, Kristiansund, Tromsoe, Heidrun, Valhall

Netherlands

Den Helder, Global Distribution Centre

Poland

Rzeszow

United States

Dallas

== Accidents and incidents ==
- On 27 December 2006, a CHC Scotia Eurocopter AS365 Dauphin, registration G-BLUN, crashed while approaching a gas platform in Morecambe Bay, Irish Sea. The crew of seven (two pilots and five passengers) all died in the accident.
- On 23 August 2013, a CHC Super Puma L2 crashed 2 nm from Sumburgh Airport in Shetland, Scotland. The aircraft capsized and four of eighteen occupants died; twelve passengers and two crew were rescued.
- On 29 April 2016, a CHC Eurocopter EC225 Super Puma crashed near Turøy, Norway. The main rotor assembly detached from the aircraft and all 13 people on board were killed.
- On 14 March 2017, CHC Sikorsky S-92, operating as Rescue 116, crashed into Blackrock Island (Mayo) off Blacksod, West of Ireland. All four crew members (pilot Captain Dara Fitzpatrick, co-pilot Captain Mark Duffy, and winch operators Paul Ormsby and Ciaran Smith) died in the crash.

== See also ==
- 2013 CHC Helicopters Eurocopter AS332 crash
- Canadian Helicopters
- CHC Airways
