= Pakistan International Airlines Flight 17 =

1966 helicopter accident in East Pakistan

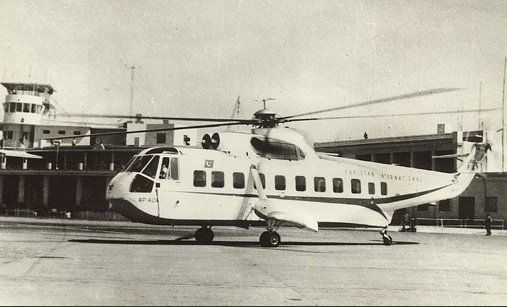
- A Sikorsky S-61N, similar to the accident helicopter

Accident
- Date: 2 February 1966
- Summary: Mechanical failure
- Site: Near Faridpur, East Pakistan

Aircraft
- Aircraft type: Sikorsky S-61N
- Operator: Pakistan International Airlines
- Registration: AP-AOC
- Flight origin: Dacca, East Pakistan
- Destination: Faridpur Heliport, Faridpur, East Pakistan
- Occupants: 24
- Passengers: 21
- Crew: 3
- Fatalities: 23
- Survivors: 1

On 2 February 1966, Pakistan International Airlines Flight 17, a Sikorsky S-61N operating a scheduled domestic passenger flight from Dacca to Faridpur in East Pakistan, (Note: Now Bangladesh) crashed near Faridpur whilst on final approach to its heliport, killing all 3 crew members and 20 of the 21 passengers.

== Background ==
=== Aircraft and crew ===
The aircraft involved was a Sikorsky S-61N registered as AP-AOC. The aircraft was airworthy for the flight. Onboard the aircraft were 24 occupants, including 21 passengers and 3 crew members. The three crew members included 34-year-old Captain Shamsul Alam, 30-year-old First Officer Nurur Rahman, and 22-year-old flight attendant Ayub. Both pilots were properly trained and certificated.

=== Flight route ===
Flight 17 was a scheduled domestic flight from Dacca to Faridpur, East Pakistan. After landing in Faridpur, the aircraft was then scheduled to fly to Kushtia, from which it would fly to Rajshahi. The flight from Dacca to Faridpur was meant to take 22 minutes; the flight from Faridpur to Kushtia was meant to take 20 minutes.

== Accident ==
On 2 February 1966, the aircraft, operating a scheduled domestic flight from Dacca to Faridpur, East Pakistan, took off at 14:03 local time. Within 15 minutes, an oil leak had started from an external pipe connected to the main gearbox. The flight continued on, relaying at 14:18:32 that they left the control zone and reporting at 14:19 that they were in contact with Faridpur Heliport, being 25 nautical miles (46 km) out and flying at 500 feet (150 m). After crossing the Padma River, the sole survivor noticed that an oil leak was visible in the passenger cabin. Around 3 miles (4,800 m) away from Faridpur, one of the helicopter's retreating blades was struck by a vulture; despite the collision, the flight continued normally and prepared for final approach to the heliport. The helicopter was flying at an altitude of 300 feet (91 m) with a speed not more than 90 knots (170 km/h) with its landing gear extended, when it experienced a loss of power to the main transmission, despite both engines running normally. The pilot corrected the resulting turn to the left, then the helicopter turned 90º and continued rolling and rocking in a steep, uncontrolled descent. At 14:23, the helicopter crashed into the ground with its nose low and a banking of 30º to the right. Witnesses reported seeing white rotor smoke under the rotorhead. A fire subsequently broke out, and heavy smoke was also being produced. Passenger Muhammad Abdul Mannan managed to escape shortly after the crash and was taken to the by farmers working in rice fields. Taken to Faridpur Hospital, his condition was described as satisfactory and "out of danger". He did not sustain injuries. All the other occupants remained trapped in the aircraft, and the fire eventually consumed the cockpit and the main cabin. All 3 crew members and 20 of the 21 passengers were killed.

== Aftermath ==
Despite "every effort [being] made with the equipment available", rescue efforts were considered unsatisfactory due to delays stemming from inadequate equipment and difficult terrain.

== Investigation ==
On the same day, Asghar Khan, the Chief Administrator of Civil Aviation, ordered an investigation into the crash. PIA issued a press release stating that Khan and a Civil Aviation and PIA investigating team were leaving for Dacca the following morning.

The investigation found that the aircraft was in one piece when it crashed and that its main rotors were operating. It also found that the bird strike had a negligeable impact on the helicopter as there was no evidence of an in-flight breakup or abnormalities occurring shortly thereafter.

The accident was attributed to the disengagement of the left and right spur gear teeth in the main transmission, caused by the load imposed by the failure of the gearbox's rear sleeve bearing journals. The rear sleeve bearing failure was caused by an oil leak, although evidence was destroyed by fire and the source of the leak was not established.
