= List of airports in the Netherlands =

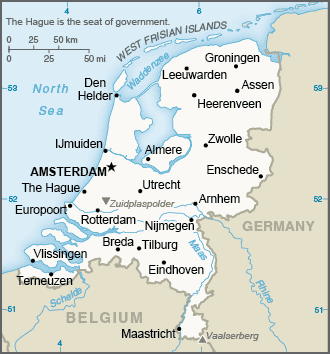
Map of the Netherlands

This is a list of airports in the Netherlands, grouped by type and sorted by location.

The largest airport by far is Amsterdam Airport Schiphol, which is the third largest in Europe. Smaller airports with scheduled passenger service are Rotterdam The Hague Airport (formerly known as Zestienhoven), Groningen Airport Eelde, Eindhoven Airport and Maastricht Aachen Airport. De Peel, Valkenburg and Soesterberg have been closed as military airports and are now mainly used by gliders. The future of the former military airport, Twente, is uncertain.

Rarely used helipads without an ICAO indicator, offshore oilrigs and small glider fields are not included in this list. Medical helipads have been assigned the identification codes EH0001 to EH0031 by the Dutch authorities, but these are not official ICAO indicators and thus these helipads are not included in this list. The Maasvlakte and IJmuiden helipads are restricted to maritime piloting services and are not connected to the AFTN network. Air Operations Control Station Nieuw-Milligen is a military air traffic control centre and has a single helipad for military use.

After the dissolution of the Netherlands Antilles the airports on Bonaire, Saba and Sint Eustatius became a part of the Netherlands, however they use the TN prefix instead of EH which is used for other Dutch airports.

== Airports ==
ICAO location indicators are linked to the airport's Aeronautical Information Publication (AIP) from AIS the Netherlands.

Airport names shown in bold indicate the airport is used by scheduled airlines.

| City served / Location | Province | ICAO | IATA | Airport name | Coordinates |
|---|---|---|---|---|---|
| **Civil airports** | | | | | |
| Ameland / Ballum | Friesland | EHAL | | Ameland Airport | 53°27′06″N 005°40′38″E |
| Amsterdam / Haarlemmermeer | North Holland | EHAM | AMS | **Amsterdam Airport Schiphol** | 52°18′29″N 004°45′51″E |
| Arnhem | Gelderland | EHTL | | Terlet Airfield | 52°03′26″N 005°55′28″E |
| Bonaire | n/a (Caribbean Netherlands) | TNCB | BON | **Flamingo International Airport** | 12°07′51″N 068°16′06″W |
| Budel | North Brabant | EHBD | | Kempen Airport (Budel Airport) | 51°15′16″N 005°36′03″E |
| Den Helder | North Holland | EHKD | DHR | Den Helder Airport; Marinevliegkamp (Naval Air Base) De Kooy | 52°55′28″N 004°46′51″E |
| Deventer / Apeldoorn / Teuge | Gelderland | EHTE | | Teuge Airport | 52°14′41″N 006°02′48″E |
| Drachten | Friesland | EHDR | | Drachten Airfield | 53°07′05″N 006°07′45″E |
| Eindhoven | North Brabant | EHEH | EIN | **Eindhoven Airport**; Eindhoven Air Base | 51°27′00″N 005°22′28″E |
| Enschede / Twente | Overijssel | EHTW | ENS | Enschede Airport Twente | 52°16′33″N 006°53′21″E |
| Groningen / Eelde | Drenthe | EHGG | GRQ | **Groningen Airport Eelde** | 53°07′30″N 006°35′00″E |
| Hilversum | North Holland | EHHV | | Hilversum Airport | 52°11′31″N 005°08′49″E |
| Hoeven / Bosschenhoofd (Seppe) | North Brabant | EHSE | | Breda International Airport | 51°33′17″N 004°33′09″E |
| Hoogeveen | Drenthe | EHHO | | Hoogeveen Airport | 52°43′51″N 006°30′58″E |
| Lelystad | Flevoland | EHLE | LEY | Lelystad Airport | 52°27′37″N 005°31′38″E |
| Maastricht / Beek | Limburg | EHBK | MST | **Maastricht Aachen Airport** | 50°54′57″N 005°46′37″E |
| Middelburg | Zeeland | EHMZ | | Midden-Zeeland Airport | 51°30′44″N 003°43′52″E |
| Middenmeer | North Holland | EHMM | | Middenmeer Aerodrome | 52°49′00″N 005°01′40″E |
| Rotterdam/The Hague | South Holland | EHRD | RTM | **Rotterdam The Hague Airport** | 51°57′25″N 004°26′14″E |
| Saba | n/a (Caribbean Netherlands) | TNCS | SAB | **Juancho E. Yrausquin Airport** | 17°38′43″N 063°13′14″W |
| Sint Eustatius | n/a (Caribbean Netherlands) | TNCE | EUX | **F.D. Roosevelt Airport** | 17°29′47″N 062°58′45″W |
| Stadskanaal | Groningen | EHST | | Stadskanaal Airfield | 52°59′55″N 007°01′22″E |
| Texel / Den Burg | North Holland | EHTX | | Texel International Airport | 53°06′55″N 004°50′01″E |
| Winschoten / Oostwold | Groningen | EHOW | | Oostwold Airport | 53°12′29″N 007°01′54″E |
| **Military air bases** | | | | | |
| Arnhem | Gelderland | EHDL | | Deelen Air Base | 52°03′33″N 005°52′38″E |
| Eindhoven | North Brabant | EHEH | EIN | **Eindhoven Airport**; Eindhoven Air Base | 51°27′00″N 005°22′28″E |
| Gilze-Rijen | North Brabant | EHGR | GLZ | Gilze-Rijen Air Base | 51°34′06″N 004°55′36″E |
| Leeuwarden | Friesland | EHLW | LWR | Leeuwarden Air Base | 53°13′40″N 005°45′36″E |
| Leiden | South Holland | EHVB | LID | Valkenburg Naval Air Base (closed) | 52°10′00″N 004°25′09″E |
| Nieuw-Milligen | Gelderland | EHMC / EHML | | Air Operations Control Station Nieuw-Milligen | 52°14′07″N 005°45′00″E |
| Soesterberg | Utrecht | EHSB | UTC | Soesterberg Air Base (closed) | 52°07′39″N 005°16′26″E |
| Uden | North Brabant | EHVK | UDE | Volkel Air Base | 51°39′26″N 005°41′34″E |
| Venray | Limburg | EHDP | | De Peel Air Base (closed) | 51°31′04″N 005°51′34″E |
| Woensdrecht | North Brabant | EHWO | WOE | Woensdrecht Air Base | 51°26′56″N 004°20′30″E |
| **Heliports** | | | | | |
| Amsterdam | North Holland | EHHA | | Amsterdam Heliport | 52°24′56″N 004°48′01″E |
| Ede | Gelderland | | | Lukkien Heliport | 52°01′22″N 005°37′26″E |
| Emmer Compascuum | Drenthe | | | Heli Holland Heliport | 52°48′12″N 006°57′26″E |
| Harskamp | Gelderland | | | Harskamp Heliport | 52°07′28″N 005°44′07″E |
| Heythuysen | Limburg | | | Helico Heliport | 51°14′34″N 005°54′19″E |
| IJmuiden | North Holland | EHYM | | IJmuiden Heliport (YPAD) | 52°28′12″N 004°35′42″E |
| Rotterdam | South Holland | EHTP | | Maasvlakte Heliport | 51°57′34″N 004°05′24″E |
| Vlieland | Friesland | EHVL | | Vlieland Heliport | 53°17′48″N 005°05′09″E |

== See also ==
- List of the busiest airports in the Netherlands
- List of airports by ICAO code: EH-EY#EH - Netherlands
- List of airports in the Netherlands Antilles
- Transport in the Netherlands
- Wikipedia: WikiProject Aviation/Airline destination lists: Europe#Netherlands
