= 302 Squadron =

302 Squadron may refer to:

- 302nd Tactical Fighter Squadron (JASDF), Japan
- No. 302 Polish Fighter Squadron
- 302 Squadron (Portugal)
- 302 Squadron (Royal Netherlands Air Force)
- 302nd Fighter Squadron, United States
