= Structure of the Royal Netherlands Air and Space Force =

This article represents the structure of the Royal Netherlands Air and Space Force as of November 2026:

== Structure ==
- Commander of the Royal Netherlands Air and Space Force
  - Air and Space Force Command Staff, in Breda
    - Operations Directorate
      - Operation Center, in The Hague
    - Materiel Logistic Maintenance Directorate
    - Personnel and Management Directorate

=== Air Combat Command ===
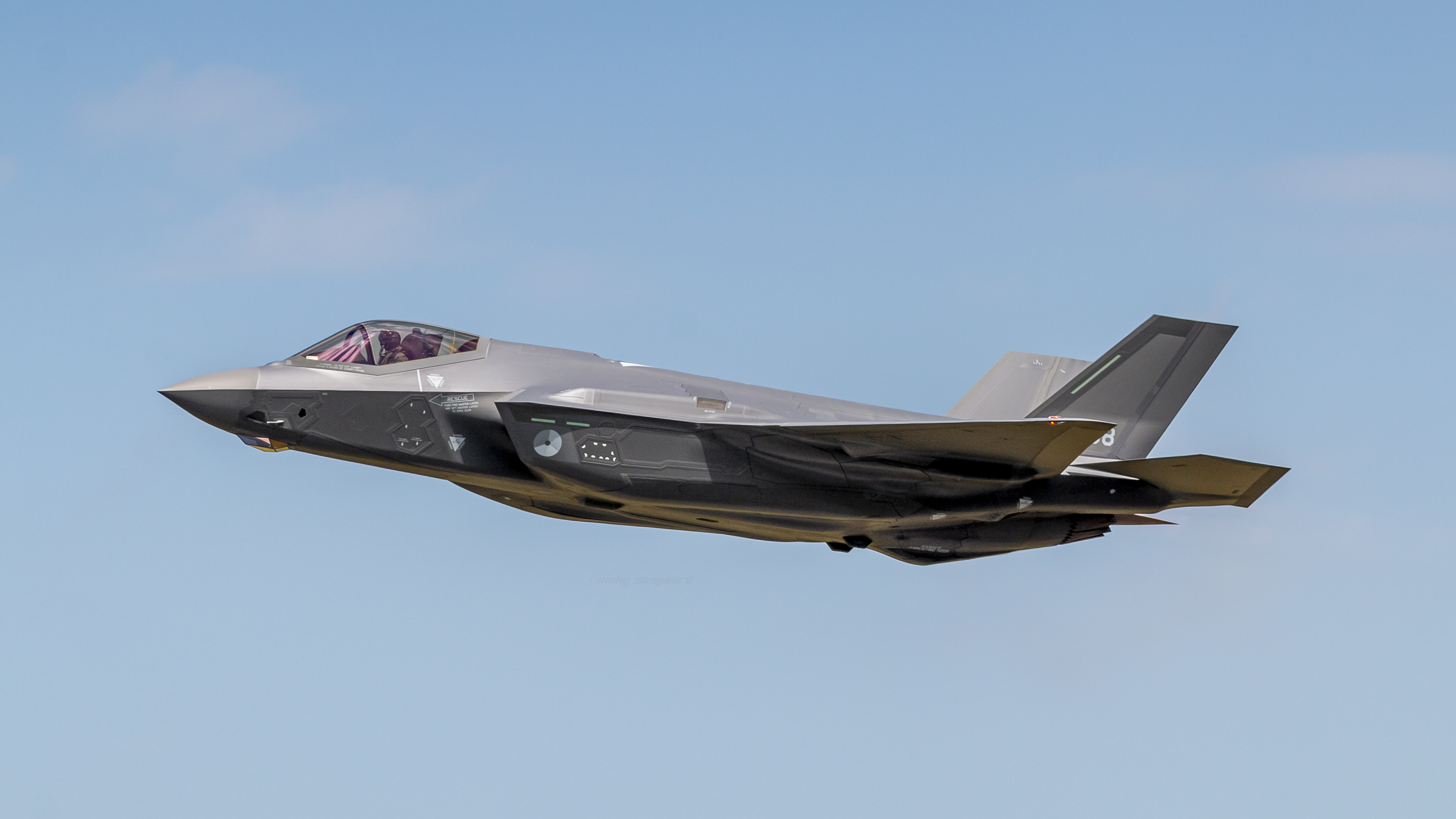
F-35A Lightning II departing Volkel Air Base

- Air Combat Command (ACC), in Nieuw-Milligen
  - Air Operations Control Station Nieuw-Milligen^{Note 1}, in Nieuw-Milligen
    - 710 Squadron (operates the Control and Command Center (CRC)
    - 711 Squadron, at Schiphol Airport (operates the Military Air Traffic Control Center (MilATCC)
    - Air Control School
    - National Datalink Management Cell
    - Radar Station South, in Nieuw-Milligen, with SMART-L GB
    - Radar Station North, in Wier, with SMART-L GB
  - Volkel Air Base^{Note 2}
    - 312 Squadron, with F-35A Lightning II
    - 313 Squadron, with F-35A Lightning II
    - 640 Squadron (Air base operations)
    - 901 Squadron (Logistic support)
  - Leeuwarden Air Base
    - 306 Squadron, with MQ-9 Reaper
    - 322 Squadron, with F-35A Lightning II
    - 323 Squadron (Air Combat Development Center; with a detachment at Edwards Air Force Base)
    - 921 Squadron (Logistic support)
    - 922 Squadron (Air base operations)

Note 1: Air Operations Control Station Nieuw-Milligen (AOCS NM) is part of the NATO Integrated Air Defense System and monitors and secures the Dutch part of NATO airspace. The center reports to Air Operations Center Uedem (NATO CAOC Uedem) in Uedem, Germany.

Note 2: As part of NATO's nuclear sharing the US Air Force's 703rd Munitions Support Squadron, 52nd Fighter Wing stores B61 tactical nuclear weapons at Volkel for use with Dutch F-35A Lightning II.

=== Air Mobility Command ===
Eindhoven Air Base is home to all transport and aerial refueling aircraft of the Royal Netherlands Air and Space Force. Furthermore NATO's Multi Role Tanker Transport Capability (MRTT-C) is based at Eindhoven.

- Air Mobility Command (AMC), at Eindhoven Air Base
  - Eindhoven Air Base
    - 334 Squadron, with 1 × Gulfstream G650ER & the Dutch contingent of the Multinational MRTT Unit's 12 × A330 MRTT
    - 336 Squadron, with 2 × C-130H Hercules & 2 × C-130H-30 Hercules (being replaced by 5 × C-390 Millennium)
    - 940 Squadron (Logistic support)
    - 941 Squadron (Air base operations)
    - 942 Squadron (Maintenance)

Multinational organizations located at Eindhoven Air Base:

- Movement Coordination Centre Europe (MCCE)
- European Air Transport Command (EATC)
- Multinational MRTT Unit (MMU)

=== Defence Helicopter Command ===
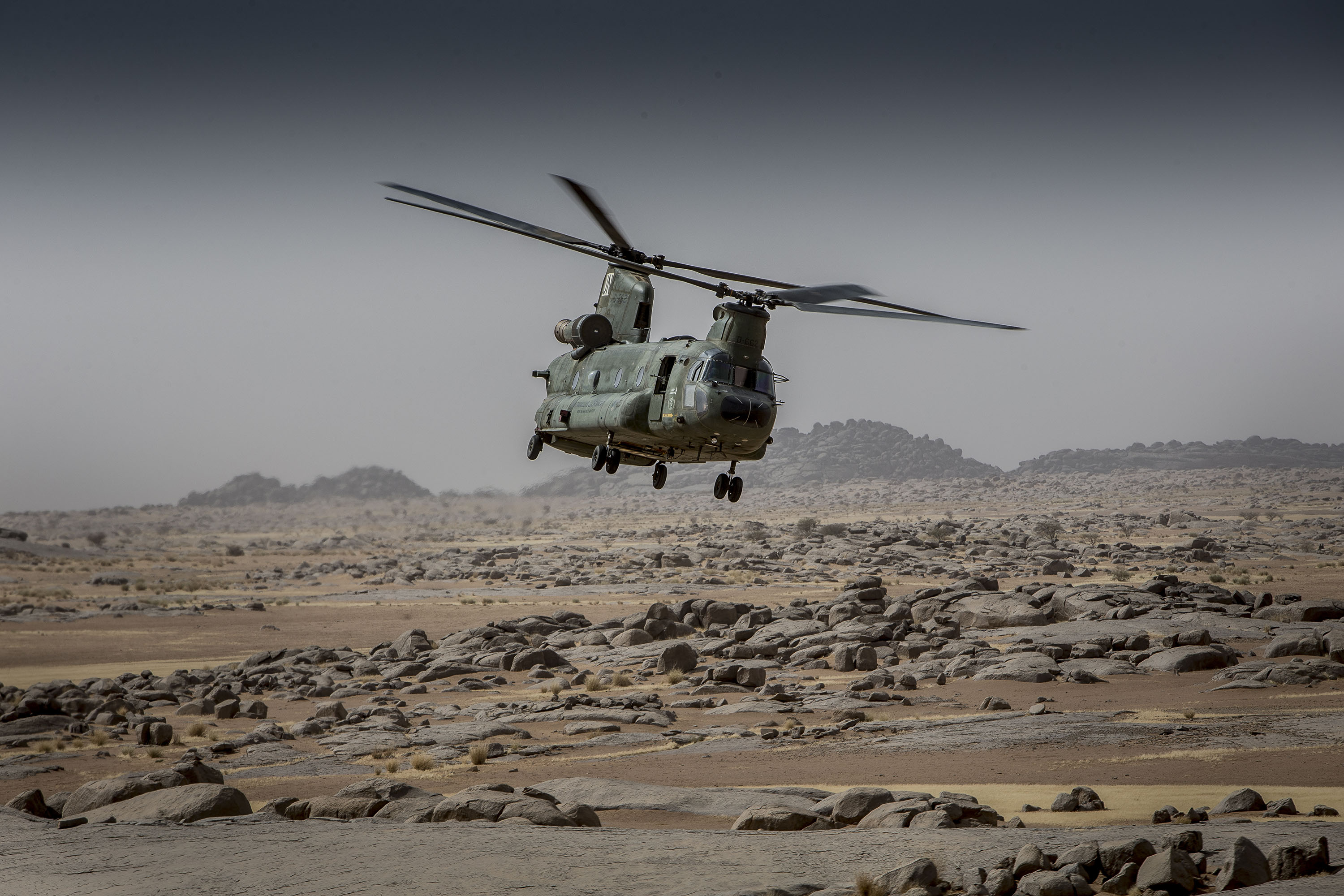
298 Squadron CH-47D Chinook in Mali

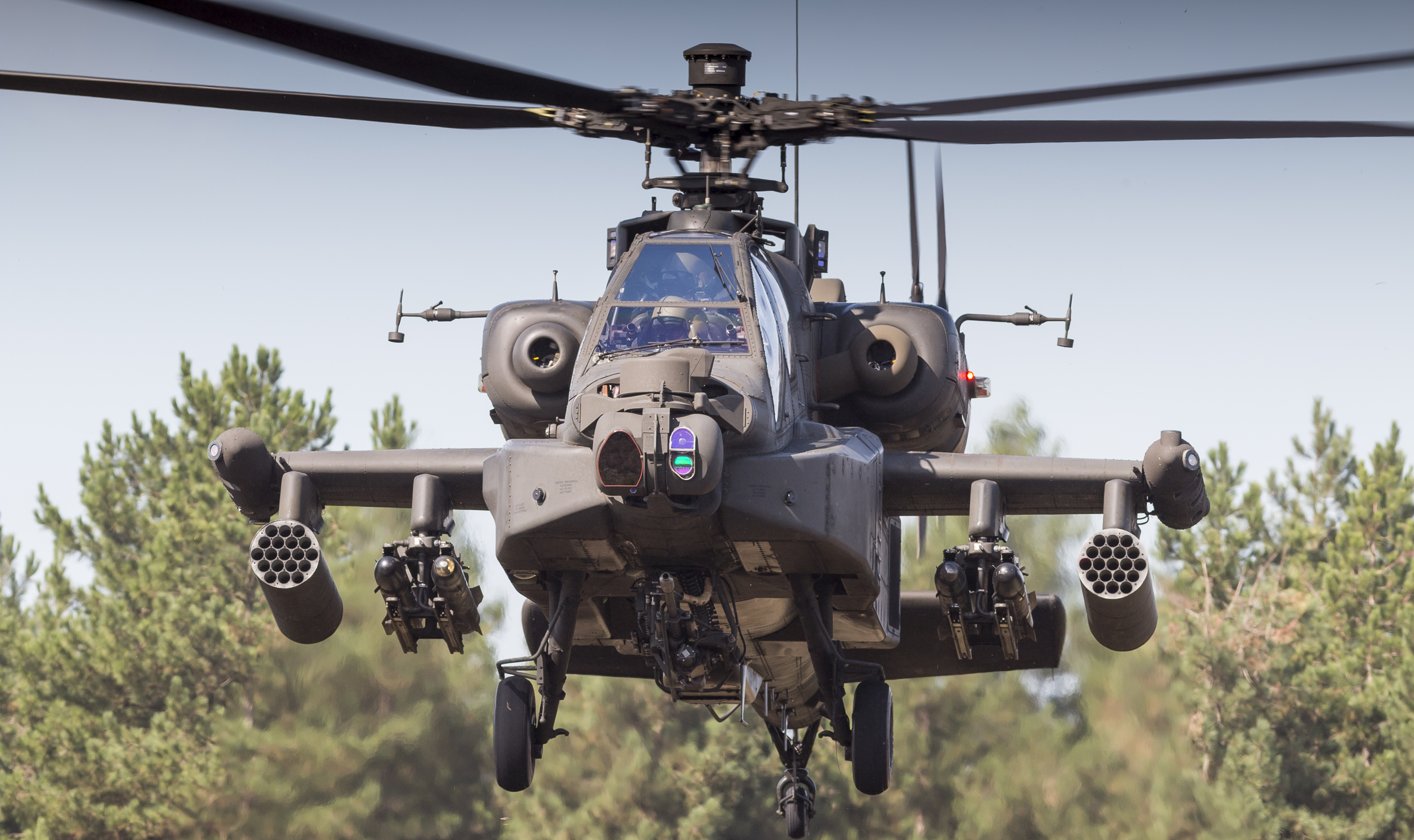
AH-64D Apache attack helicopter

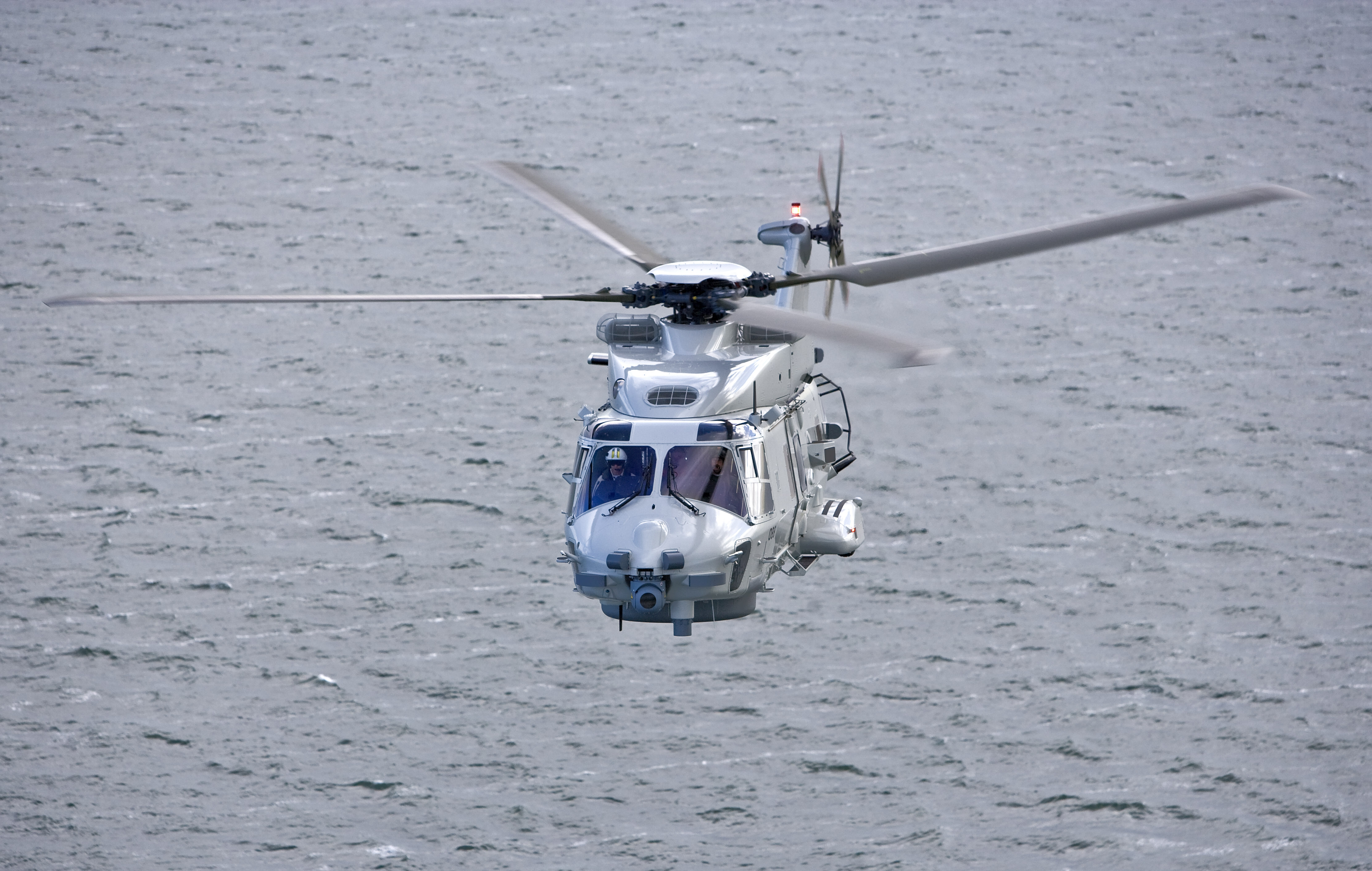
NH90 NFH helicopter

The Defense Helicopter Command at Gilze-Rijen Air Base consists of all helicopter units of the Armed forces of the Netherlands. The air and space force's SERE School is also located at Gilze-Rijen Air Base.

- Defence Helicopter Command (DHC), at Gilze-Rijen Air Base
  - 7 Squadron (Training and Simulation Squadron), at Gilze-Rijen Air Base and Maritime Airfield De Kooy
  - 299 Squadron (Helicopter Warfare Center), at Gilze-Rijen Air Base and Maritime Airfield De Kooy
  - 302 Squadron, at Fort Hood in Texas, with AH-64E Apache and CH-47F Chinook
  - Deelen Air Base, no flying units, regularly used for joint exercises with the Royal Netherlands Army's 11th Airmobile Brigade
  - Gilze-Rijen Air Base
    - 298 Squadron, with CH-47F Chinook
    - 300 Squadron (Special Operations), with 12 × AS 532U2 Cougar Mk2
    - 301 Squadron, with AH-64E Apache
    - 930 Squadron (Maintenance)
    - 931 Squadron (Air base operations)
  - Maritime Airfield De Kooy, flying helicopters for the Royal Netherlands Navy
    - 860 Squadron, with NH90 NFH helicopters
    - 990 Squadron (Air base operations and maintenance)

=== Air Support Command ===
PC-7 Turbo Trainer in flight

The Air Support Command is responsible for training, logistics, and maintenance. The command is located at Woensdrecht Air Base. The Royal Air Education and Training Center and the Air Depot and Program Management are also located at Woensdrecht. The Royal Air Education and Training Center at Woensdrecht Air Base is the training institute for all Royal Netherlands Air and Space Force personnel, except officer candidates, which are trained at the Royal Military Academy. The base also houses a Fire Fighting Exercise and Training Center, and the Joint Meteorological Group, which provides meteorological services to all branches of the Armed forces of the Netherlands.

- Air Support Command (ASC), at Woensdrecht Air Base
  - Royal Air Education and Training Center, at Woensdrecht Air Base
    - 130 Squadron (Military training)
    - 131 Squadron (Basic military aviator training), with PC-7 Turbo Trainer planes
    - 133 Squadron (Basic technical training)
    - 961 Squadron (Air base operations)
    - Joint Meteorological Group
    - Fire Fighting Exercise and Training Center
  - Air Depot and Program Management, at Woensdrecht Air Base
    - 980 Squadron (Aircraft maintenance)
    - 981 Squadron (Components maintenance)
    - 982 Squadron (Technology and mission support)
    - 983 Squadron (Logistics, manages the air and space force's central inventory)

=== Air and Space Force Reserve Group ===
The Air and Space Force Reserve Group was established in November 2004 (as Air Force Reserve Group) and fell under the Defense Helicopter Command. Since 2019 the group is an independent formation.

- Air and Space Force Reserve Group, in Breda
  - 519 Squadron, at Air Operations Control Station Nieuw-Milligen
    - 1st Flight at Leeuwarden Air Base, 2nd and 3rd Flight at AOCS Nieuw-Milligen, 4th and 5th Flight at Volkel Air Base
  - 520 Squadron, at Gilze-Rijen Air Base
    - 6th Flight at Eindhoven Air Base, 7th and 8th Flight at Gilze-Rijen Air Base, 9th Flight at Woensdrecht Air Base

=== People and Aviation Center ===
The People and Aviation Center in Soesterberg is the air and space force's research, selection, aviation medicine, psychology and physiology center.

- People and Aviation Center, in Soesterberg

== Squadrons assigned to other commands ==
The following Royal Netherlands Air and Space Force squadrons are assigned to other commands:

- Royal Netherlands Army
  - Joint Ground-based Air Defense Command, in Vredepeel
    - 800 Squadron (Support)
    - 802 Squadron, with MIM-104 Patriot long range surface-to-air missiles
- Royal Military Academy, in Breda
  - Cadets Squadron
  - 121 Squadron (Military Scientific Training)
  - 122 Squadron (Basic Officer Training)

== Air and Space Force organization graphic ==
Royal Netherlands Air and Space Force organization as of November 2026 (click to enlarge)

== Geographic distribution of units ==
Royal Netherlands Air and Space Force locations as of November 2026:
F-35A Lightning II Helicopters Other flying units
SMART-L GB Radar station Air Operations Control Station Other bases
