= List of the busiest airports in the Netherlands =

This is a list of the busiest airports in the Netherlands.

== Busiest airports by total passengers ==
These are the Netherlands' five busiest airports by passenger traffic from the years 2011-2023.

=== 2023 ===
Rank	Airport	City	IATA/ICAO	Total passengers	Annual change	Rank change
1	Amsterdam Airport Schiphol	Amsterdam	AMS/EHAM	67,887,628	▲17.9%	Steady
2	Eindhoven Airport	Eindhoven	EIN/EHEH	6,876,917	▲8.6%	Steady
3	Rotterdam The Hague Airport	Rotterdam	RTM/EHRD	2,224,605	▲5.3%	Steady
4	Maastricht Aachen Airport	Maastricht	MST/EHBK	223,152	▼16.1%	Steady
5	Groningen Airport Eelde	Groningen	GRX/EHGG	108,535	▲24.5%	Steady

=== 2022 ===
Rank	Airport	City	IATA/ICAO	Total passengers	Annual change	Rank change
1	Amsterdam Airport Schiphol	Amsterdam	AMS/EHAM	52,470,880	▲105.8%	Steady
2	Eindhoven Airport	Eindhoven	EIN/EHEH	6,330,599	▲134.6%	Steady
3	Rotterdam The Hague Airport	Rotterdam	RTM/EHRD	2,113,342	▲179.8%	Steady
4	Maastricht Aachen Airport	Maastricht	MST/EHBK	266,032	▲172.4%	Steady
5	Groningen Airport Eelde	Groningen	GRX/EHGG	87,205	▲219.9%	Steady

=== 2021 ===
Rank	Airport	City	IATA/ICAO	Total passengers	Annual change	Rank change
1	Amsterdam Airport Schiphol	Amsterdam	AMS/EHAM	25,490,810	▲22.1%	Steady
2	Eindhoven Airport	Eindhoven	EIN/EHEH	2,698,424	▲27.7%	Steady
3	Rotterdam The Hague Airport	Rotterdam	RTM/EHRD	755,395	▲54.2%	Steady
4	Maastricht Aachen Airport	Maastricht	MST/EHBK	97,646	▲20.4%	Steady
5	Groningen Airport Eelde	Groningen	GRX/EHGG	27,260	▲55.5%	Steady

=== 2020 ===
Rank	Airport	City	IATA/ICAO	Total passengers	Annual change	Rank change
1	Amsterdam Airport Schiphol	Amsterdam	AMS/EHAM	20,884,510	▼70.9%	Steady
2	Eindhoven Airport	Eindhoven	EIN/EHEH	2,112,785	▼68.8%	Steady
3	Rotterdam The Hague Airport	Rotterdam	RTM/EHRD	489,841	▼76.6%	Steady
4	Maastricht Aachen Airport	Maastricht	MST/EHBK	81,080	▼81.4%	Steady
5	Groningen Airport Eelde	Groningen	GRX/EHGG	17,528	▼90,0%	Steady

=== 2019 ===
Rank	Airport	City	IATA/ICAO	Total passengers	Annual change	Rank change
1	Amsterdam Airport Schiphol	Amsterdam	AMS/EHAM	71,679,729	▲	Steady
2	Eindhoven Airport	Eindhoven	EIN/EHEH	6,780,775	▲	Steady
3	Rotterdam The Hague Airport	Rotterdam	RTM/EHRD	2,094,798	▲	Steady
4	Maastricht Aachen Airport	Maastricht	MST/EHBK	435,977	▲	Steady
5	Groningen Airport Eelde	Groningen	GRX/EHGG	176,022	▼	Steady

=== 2018 ===
Rank	Airport	City	Total passengers	Annual change	Rank change
1	Amsterdam Airport Schiphol	Amsterdam	70,956,594	▲	Steady
2	Eindhoven Airport	Eindhoven	6,237,755	▲	Steady
3	Rotterdam The Hague Airport	Rotterdam	1,908,158	▲	Steady
4	Maastricht Aachen Airport	Maastricht	274,986	▲	▲1
5	Groningen Airport Eelde	Groningen	228,698	▲	▼1

=== 2017 ===
Rank	Airport	City	Total passengers	Annual change	Rank change
1	Amsterdam Airport Schiphol	Amsterdam	68,400,387	▲	Steady
2	Eindhoven Airport	Eindhoven	5,701,220	▲	Steady
3	Rotterdam The Hague Airport	Rotterdam	1,732,692	▲	Steady
4	Groningen Airport Eelde	Groningen	201,786	▲	▲1
5	Maastricht Aachen Airport	Maastricht	167,544	▲	▼1

=== 2016 ===
Rank	Airport	City	Total passengers	Annual change	Rank change
1	Amsterdam Airport Schiphol	Amsterdam	63,526,363	▲	Steady
2	Eindhoven Airport	Eindhoven	4,780,197	▲	Steady
3	Rotterdam The Hague Airport	Rotterdam	1,643,993	▲	Steady
4	Maastricht Aachen Airport	Maastricht	176,562	▼	Steady
5	Groningen Airport Eelde	Groningen	152,451	▼	Steady

=== 2015 ===
Rank	Airport	City	Total passengers	Annual change	Rank change
1	Amsterdam Airport Schiphol	Amsterdam	58,245,291	▲6.0%	Steady
2	Eindhoven Airport	Eindhoven	4,373,882	▲10.6%	Steady
3	Rotterdam The Hague Airport	Rotterdam	1,639,383	▲0.9%	Steady
4	Maastricht Aachen Airport	Maastricht	195,180	▼19.1%	Steady
5	Groningen Airport Eelde	Groningen	180,879	▲6.8%	Steady

=== 2014 ===
Rank	Airport	City	Total passengers	Annual change	Rank change
1	Amsterdam Airport Schiphol	Amsterdam	54,940,534	▲4.6%	Steady
2	Eindhoven Airport	Eindhoven	3,956,364	▲15.5%	Steady
3	Rotterdam The Hague Airport	Rotterdam	1,624,877	▲9.2%	Steady
4	Maastricht Aachen Airport	Maastricht	241,473	▼43.8%	Steady
5	Groningen Airport Eelde	Groningen	169,369	▼3.9%	Steady

=== 2013 ===
Rank	Airport	Total passengers	Annual change	Rank change
1	Amsterdam	52,527,699	▲3.0%	Steady
2	Eindhoven	3,425,485	▲14.0%	Steady
3	Rotterdam	1,488,572	▲25.5%	Steady
4	Maastricht	429,545	▲40.6%	Steady
5	Groningen	176,212	▼2.5%	Steady

=== 2012 ===
Rank	Airport	Total passengers	Annual change	Rank change
1	Amsterdam	50,975,592	▲2.6%	Steady
2	Eindhoven	3,004,938	▲12.8%	Steady
3	Rotterdam	1,186,539	▲10.4%	Steady
4	Maastricht	305,439	▼8.5%	Steady
5	Groningen	180,812	▲58.2%	Steady

=== 2011 ===
Rank	Airport	Total passengers	Annual change	Rank change
1	Amsterdam	49,680,625	▲10.1%	Steady
2	Eindhoven	2,664,078	▲22.0%	Steady
3	Rotterdam	1,075,202	▲16.5%	Steady
4	Maastricht	333,910	▲47.3%	Steady
5	Groningen	114,327	▼6.8%	Steady
