= Ecotribe Teuge =

Land squat in Gelderland, Netherlands

Ecotribe Teuge is a collective of people living on a squatted terrain in the Dutch countryside. It is located on the edge of the village of Teuge, in the province of Gelderland. The buildings were constructed by the Nazis and formerly used to house Moluccan soldiers. The site was occupied in 2001, when people began to live there in an off-the-grid and self-sufficient manner. Since 2018, there are plans by the province to develop the terrain.

== History ==
The site is located on the edge of the village of Teuge, halfway along the N344 road between Apeldoorn and Deventer. The terrain consists of 11 buildings built by the Nazi occupiers during World War II. The bunkers built to serve the nearby airfield (now Teuge International Airport) were disguised as farm buildings and were never destroyed, later falling under the ownership of the Dutch Ministry of Defence.

After the war it was used as accommodation for soldiers and their families from the Republic of South Maluku. The Moluccans were tightly regulated and could only shower twice a week. In 1962, the Moluccans were permitted to move to nearby Twello.

The terrain was then bought by the de Baar family in 1990, speculating on its value for development.

== Occupation ==
The terrain was squatted in 2001 after a period of dereliction. The new inhabitants lived off-the-grid, without a connection to running water, or mains gas and electricity. They erected solar panels for electricity. They built compost toilets and a grey water filtration system. Growing vegetables in a large garden, they aimed at self-sufficiency. Artists worked with recycled materials and set up a gallery. The group organises restaurants evenings and occasional open days.

By 2018, the squatters were signing a use contract with de Baar every 6 months.

== New uses ==
In 2018, the terrain was included by the province of Gelderland in a proposal for derelict buildings to be renovated, called Challenge SteenGoed Benutten. Later in 2018, Ecotribe Teuge was raided by the local municipality and 108 marijuana plants were discovered.

The terrain was one of the three winners of Challenge SteenGoed Benutten and so the prize winners Mark Huser and Maya van Oosterhout, who currently live at Ecotribe Teuge, will receive detailed advice and help from a lifecoach about how to monetize the site.

== See also ==
- Ruigoord
- Squatting in the Netherlands
