= Hoogeveen Airport =

Hoogeveen Airport Vliegveld Hoogeveen
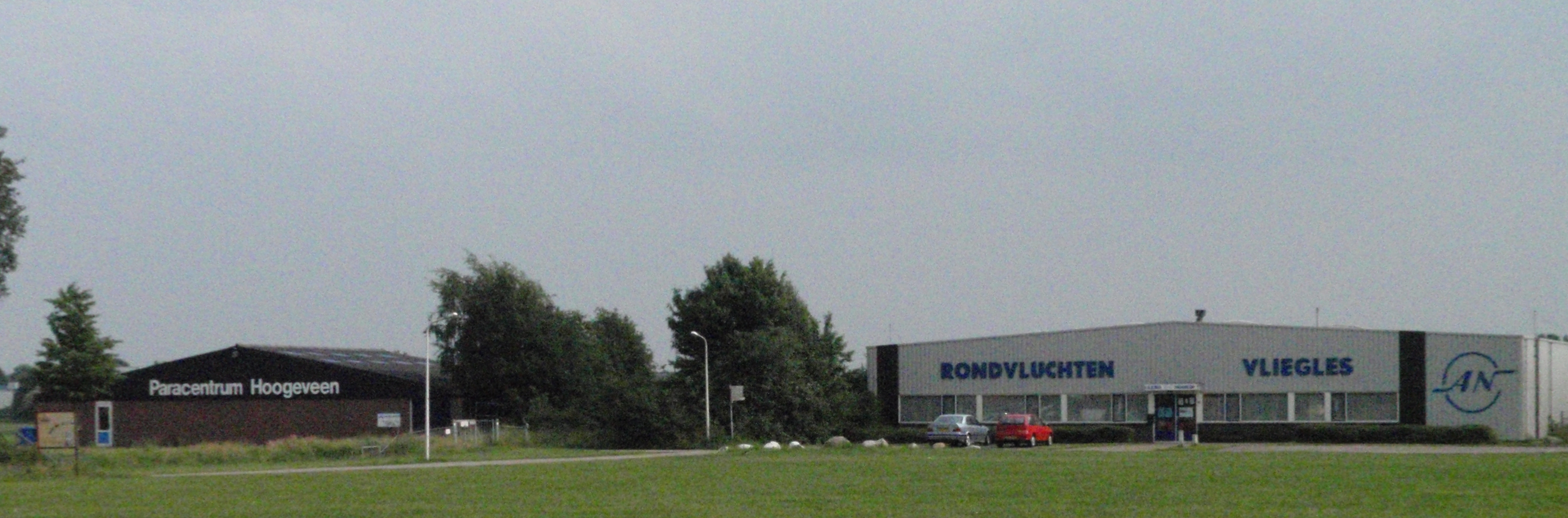
- IATA: none; ICAO: EHHO

Summary
- Airport type: Public
- Operator: Stichting Vliegveld Hoogeveen
- Serves: Hoogeveen, Netherlands
- Elevation AMSL: 40 ft / 12 m
- Coordinates: 52°43′51″N 006°30′58″E
- Website: ehho.nl
- Interactive map of Hoogeveen Airport

Runways
Direction	Length		Surface
Direction	m	ft	Surface
09/27	1,080	3,543	Grass
- Sources: AIP

Hoogeveen Airport (Dutch: Vliegveld Hoogeveen) (ICAO: EHHO) is a small general aviation airfield located 0.6 NM (1.1 km; 0.69 mi) northeast of Hoogeveen, a town in the northeastern Netherlands. There are several flying clubs and flying schools located at the airport. It has one grass runway (09/27) with a length of 1,080 m (3,543 ft). Once per year the special event Wings and Wheels is hosted here. It is a show with classic planes and cars. Special aircraft from all over The Netherlands, Germany and Belgium come to show them to the people. There is also a steakhouse on the grounds.

== Fokker ==
The airport was initially intended for the Fokker company when they made their older propeller airplanes.

== See also ==
- List of airports in the Netherlands
