= Rotterdam The Hague Airport =

Airport in Zestienhoven, Rotterdam, the Netherlands

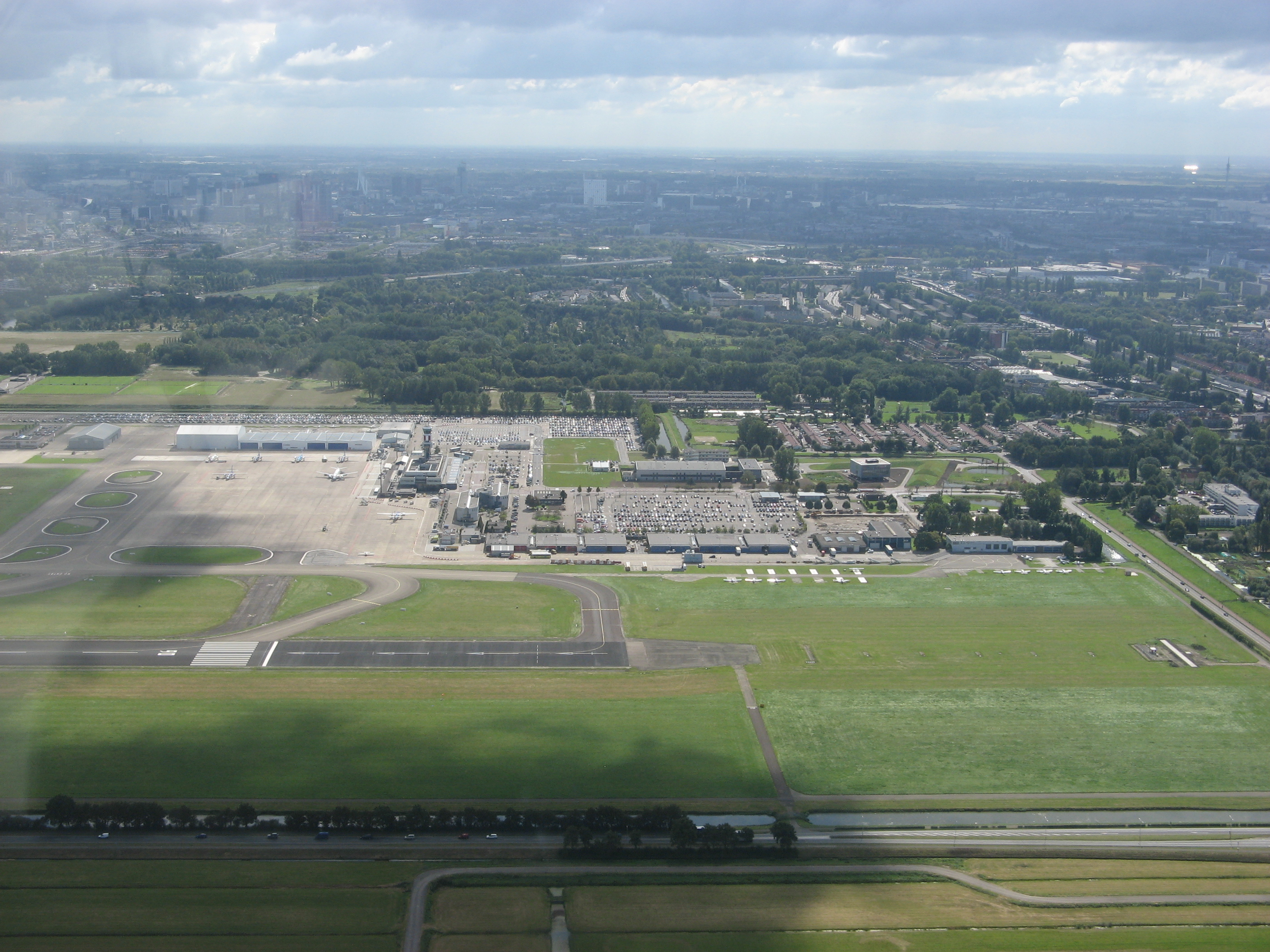
- IATA: RTM; ICAO: EHRD

Summary
- Airport type: Public
- Owner/Operator: Schiphol Group
- Serves: Rotterdam and The Hague
- Location: Zestienhoven, Rotterdam, South Holland, Netherlands
- Focus city for: Transavia; TUI fly Netherlands
- Elevation AMSL: −14 ft (−4.3 m)
- Coordinates: 51°57′25″N 04°26′25″E
- Website: rotterdamthehagueairport.nl

Map
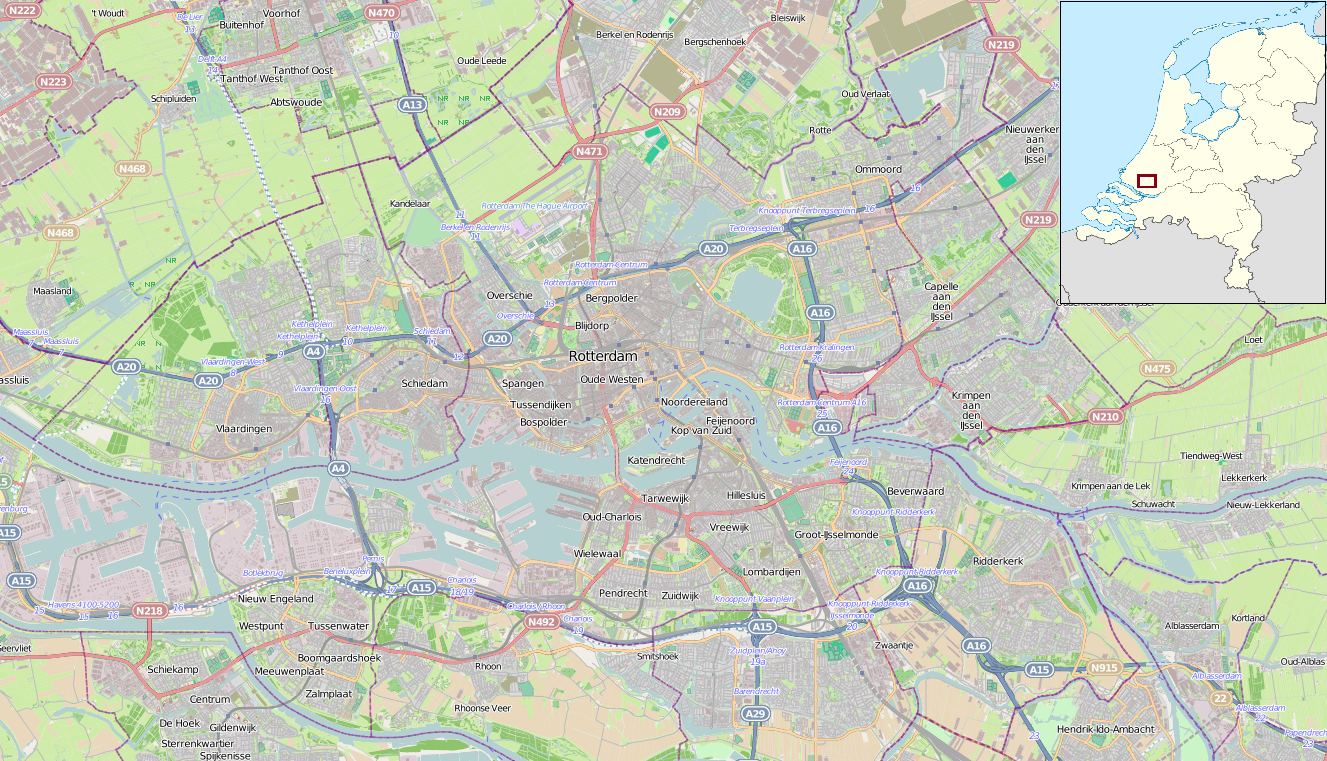
- Location of airport in Rotterdam, South Holland, Netherlands RTM/EHRD (South Holland) RTM/EHRD (Netherlands) RTM/EHRD (Europe)

Runways
Direction	Length		Surface
Direction	m	ft	Surface
06/24	2,199	7,215	Asphalt

Statistics (2019)
- Passengers: 2,133,976 ▲
- Freight (tonnes): 1 ▼
- Aircraft movements: 52,439 ▼
- Sources: AIP, 2019 Annual Facts & Statistics Report (PDF, Dutch)

Rotterdam The Hague Airport (formerly Rotterdam Airport, Vliegveld Zestienhoven in Dutch) (IATA: RTM, ICAO: EHRD) is a minor international airport serving Rotterdam, the Netherlands' second largest city, and The Hague, its administrative and royal capital. It is located 5.5 kilometres (3.4 mi; 3.0 nmi) north northwest of Rotterdam in South Holland and is the third busiest airport in the Netherlands.

The airport handled over 2.1 million passengers in 2019 and features scheduled flights to European metropolitan and leisure destinations. It is also used extensively by general aviation and there are several flying clubs, a skydiving club and a flight training school located at the airport.

== History ==
=== Early years ===
After World War II, the Dutch government decided that a second national airport was needed in addition to Schiphol. Rotterdam had previously had an airport before the war; Waalhaven airport, but it was heavily damaged in the German bombing of Rotterdam, and was later completely destroyed to prevent it from being used by the Germans. Reconstruction of the airport was not a realistic proposition, so a new location was found in the Zestienhoven polder, giving the airport its original name.

Construction of the airport began in August 1955 and the airport was officially opened in October 1956. Several large international airlines, such as Swissair, Lufthansa, Air France, Channel Airways, and British Air Ferries (Channel Air Bridge) were soon operating to Rotterdam. However, in the 1970s plans were made to either close or move the airport to make space for housing. Its uncertain future halted the airport's growth and led to many operators leaving.

=== Development since the 1990s ===
The route with the longest continual service, to London Heathrow and operated by KLM Cityhopper, was suspended in 2008. This marked the end of KLM's involvement with the airport. However, in December 2012, British Airways began a service to Rotterdam from Heathrow. In October 2014, British Airways announced they would suspend the route again in March 2015. British Airways now flies to Rotterdam from London City Airport.

The name of the airport was changed from Zestienhoven to Rotterdam Airport and finally in 2010 to its current name Rotterdam The Hague Airport.

Most flights today are operated by smaller mainline jets such as the Boeing 737 and Airbus A320 series or the Embraer 190. There is also a fair amount of business aviation. State and military aircraft also use the airport frequently, due to its proximity to The Hague, the seat of the Dutch government and various international institutions such as the International Criminal Court. With the closure of nearby Ypenburg Airport in 1992 and Valkenburg Naval Air Base in 2006, Rotterdam The Hague Airport is now the only remaining airport in the area.

== Airlines and destinations ==
The following airlines operate regular scheduled and charter flights to and from Rotterdam/The Hague:

Airlines	Destinations
Aegean Airlines	Seasonal: Athens
Air Algérie	Algiers
Air Arabia	Tangier
AJet	Istanbul–Sabiha Gökçen
Animawings	Bucharest–Otopeni, Timișoara
British Airways	London–City
Pegasus Airlines	Istanbul–Sabiha Gökçen
Sun Express	Seasonal: Ankara
Transavia	Al Hoceima, Alicante, Barcelona, Faro, Fez, Gran Canaria, Lisbon, London–Stansted, Málaga Nador, Seville, Tenerife–South, Trieste, Valencia; Seasonal: Almería, Bastia, Bergerac, Brindisi, Catania, Corfu, Dubrovnik, Geneva, Girona, Grenoble, Heraklion, Ibiza, Innsbruck, Kos, Oujda, Palermo, Palma de Mallorca, Perugia, Pula, Rome–Fiumicino, Salzburg, Split, Tangier, Toulon, Zadar
TUI fly Netherlands	Fuerteventura, Gran Canaria, Lanzarote, Tenerife–South; Seasonal: Antalya, Heraklion, Kittilä, Kos, Kuusamo, Rhodes, Zakynthos

== Statistics ==
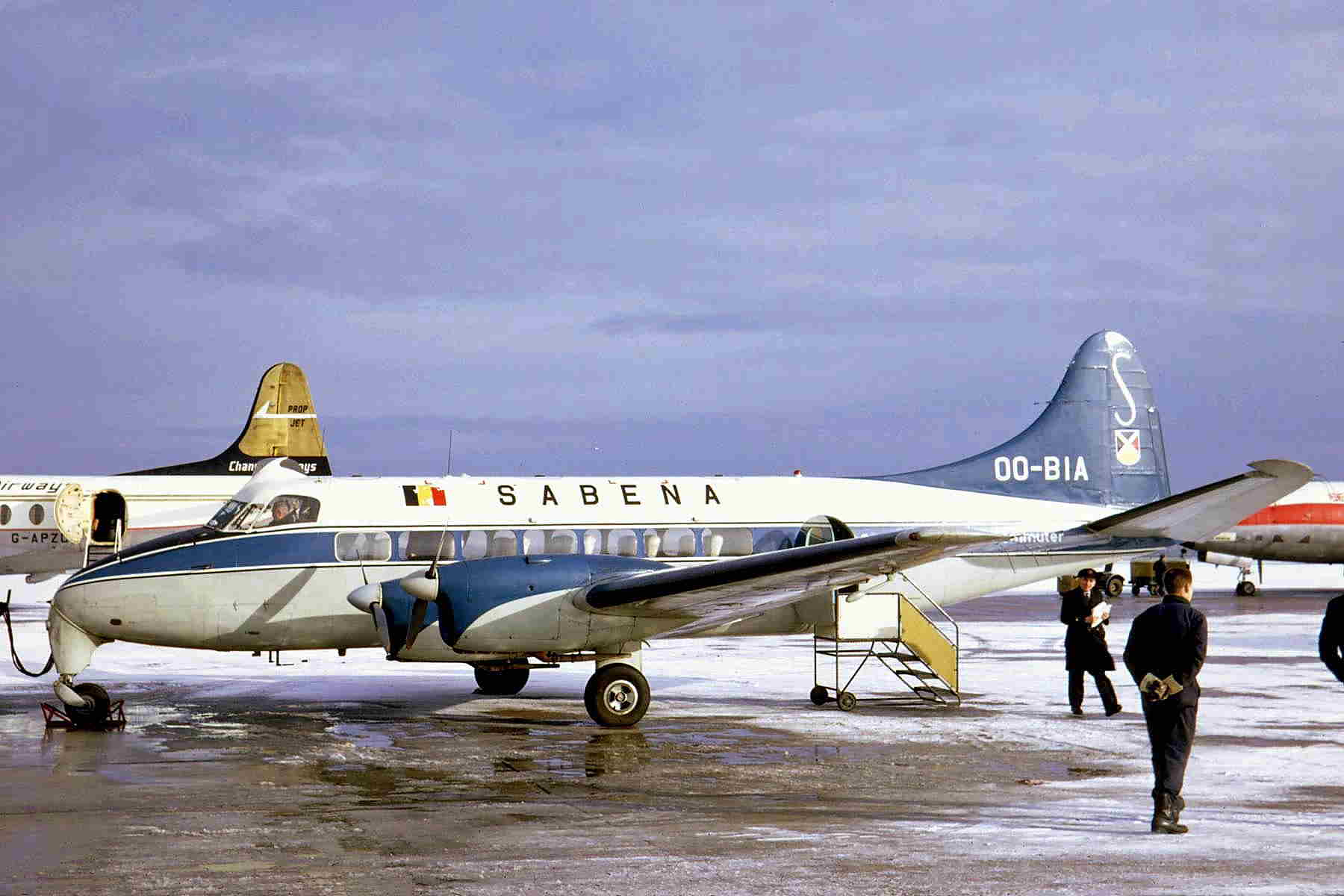
A Sabena de Havilland Heron at the airport in 1968

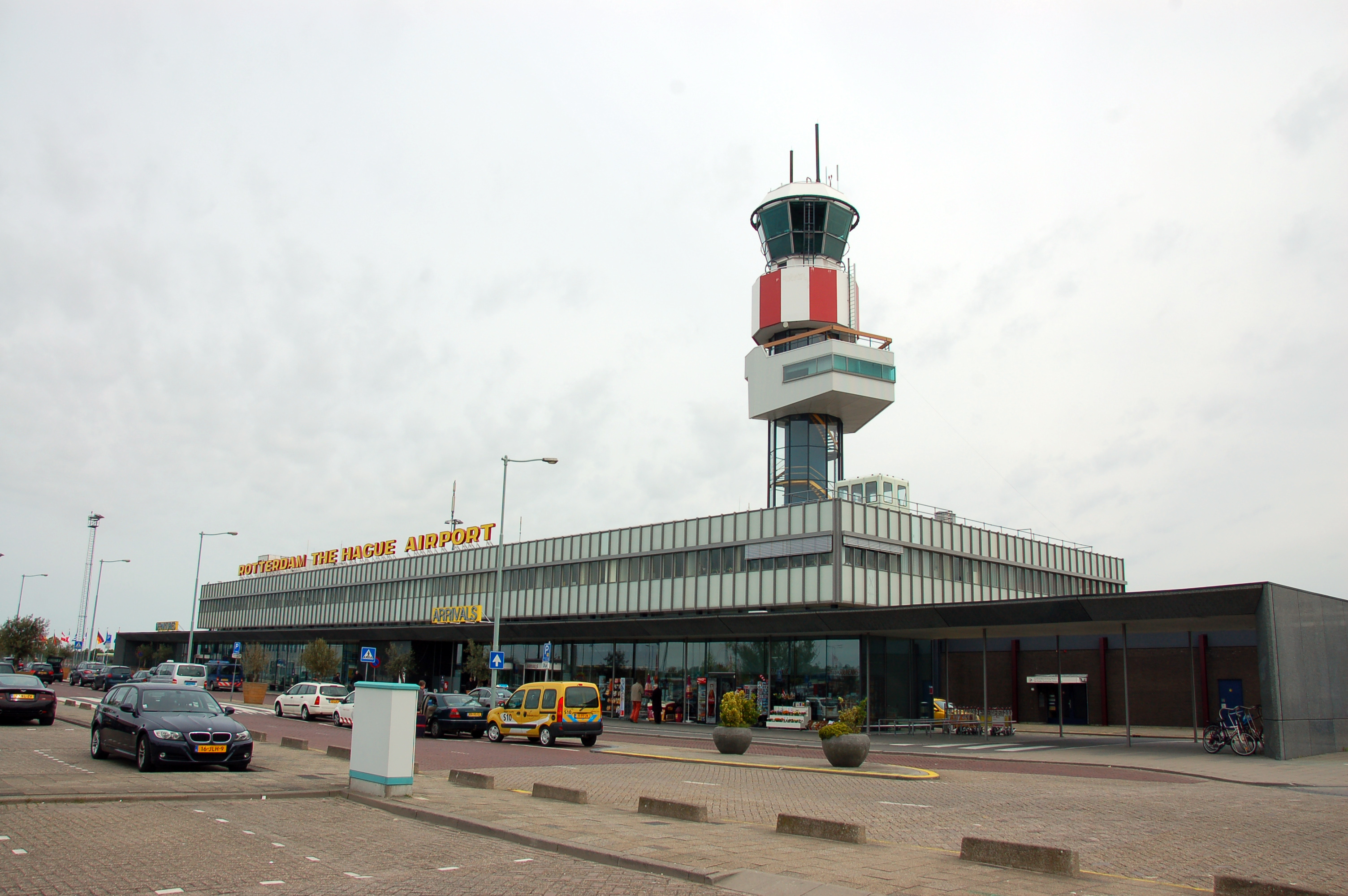
Terminal exterior

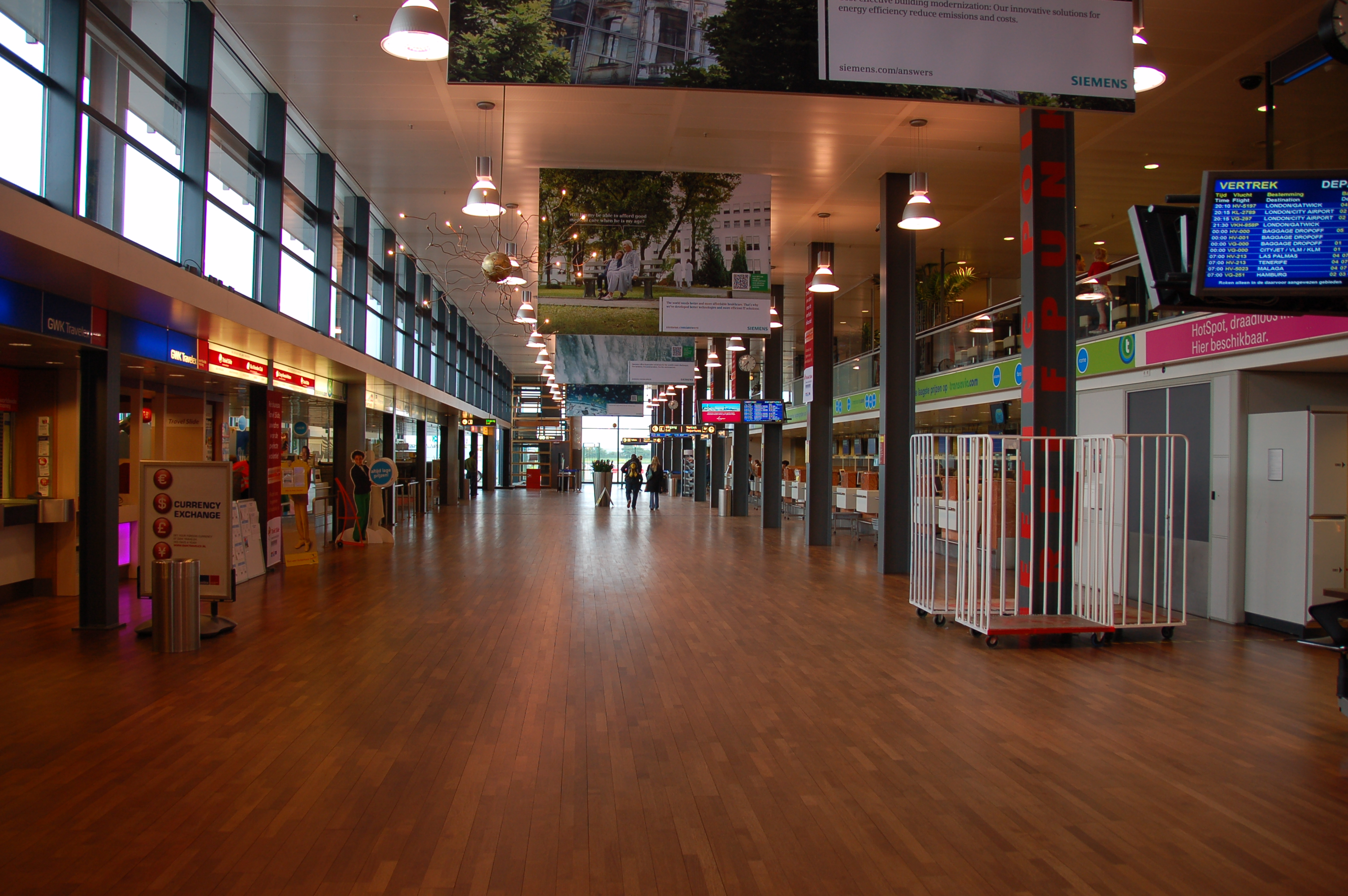
Terminal interior

=== Passenger numbers ===
Year	Passengers	Aircraft movements
2017	1,774,976 ▲	49,962 ▼
2018	1,943,733 ▲	53,322 ▲
2019	2,133,976 ▲	52,439 ▼
2020	497,078 ▼	38,653 ▼
2021	764,061 ▲	46,139 ▲
2022	2,133,708 ▲	59,444 ▲
2023	2,224,276 ▲	56,480 ▼

=== Busiest routes ===
Busiest routes from Rotterdam Airport (2024)
Rank	Airport	Passengers 2024
1	Málaga, Spain	204,485
2	Alicante, Spain	193,186
3	Faro, Portugal	157,577
4	London-City, United Kingdom	118,538
5	Barcelona, Spain	98,658
6	Istanbul-Sabiha Gökçen, Turkey	97,810
7	Ibiza, Spain	95,313
8	Tenerife-South, Spain	76,896
9	Lisbon, Portugal	72,740
10	Gran Canaria, Spain	72,287

== Ground transport ==
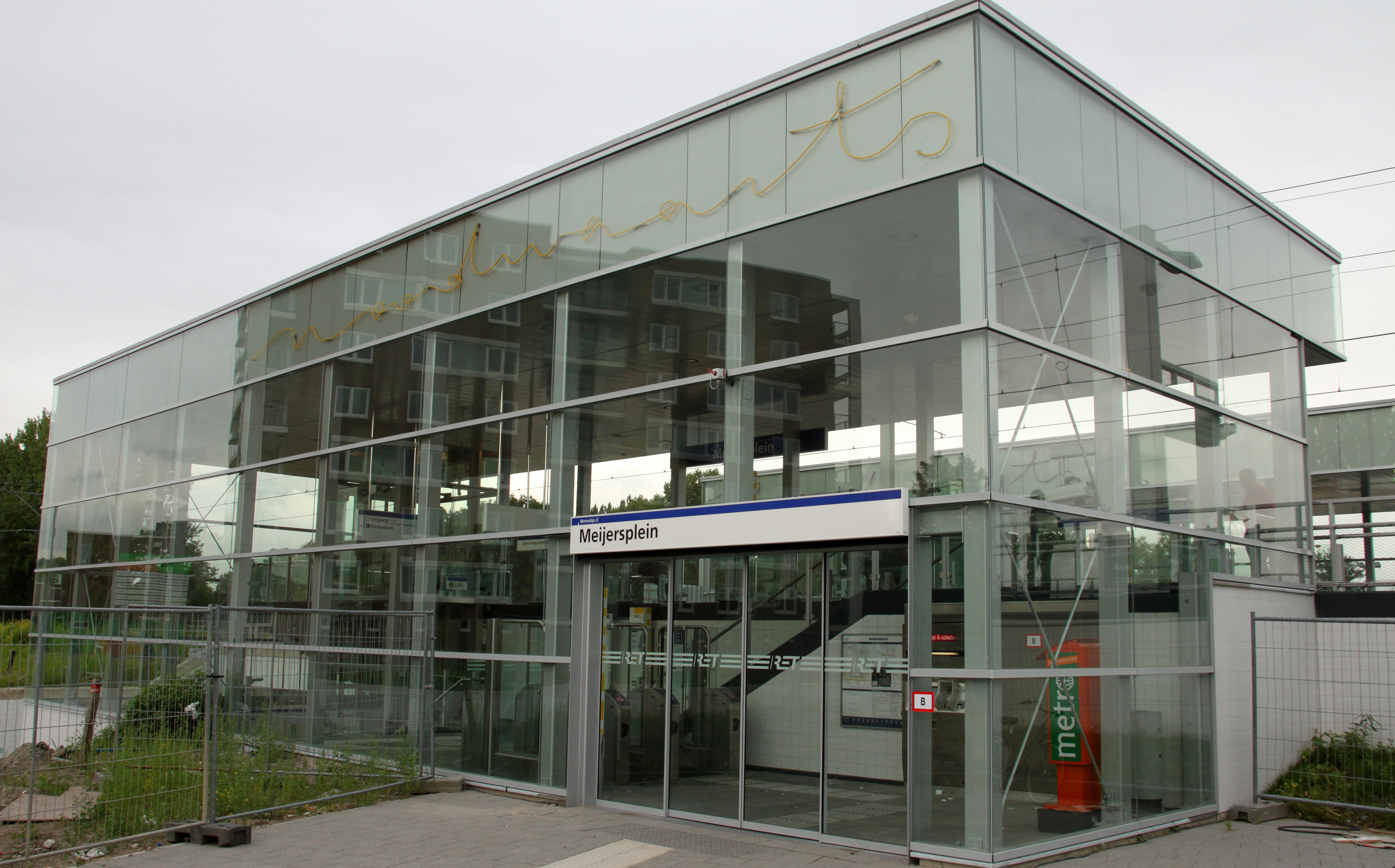
Meijersplein metro station

=== Bus ===
The airport is served by bus line 33, which runs between Rotterdam Centraal, the airport, and further to Meijersplein station. At Meijersplein, transfers are available to metro line E, with frequent service to Den Haag Centraal, Rotterdam Centraal and Rotterdam city center.

=== Car ===
The airport is situated next to the busy A13/E19 motorway, which makes it easily accessible via car.

== See also ==
- Transport in the Netherlands
- List of airports in the Netherlands
