= Amsterdam Heliport =

Amsterdam Heliport Amsterdam Helihaven
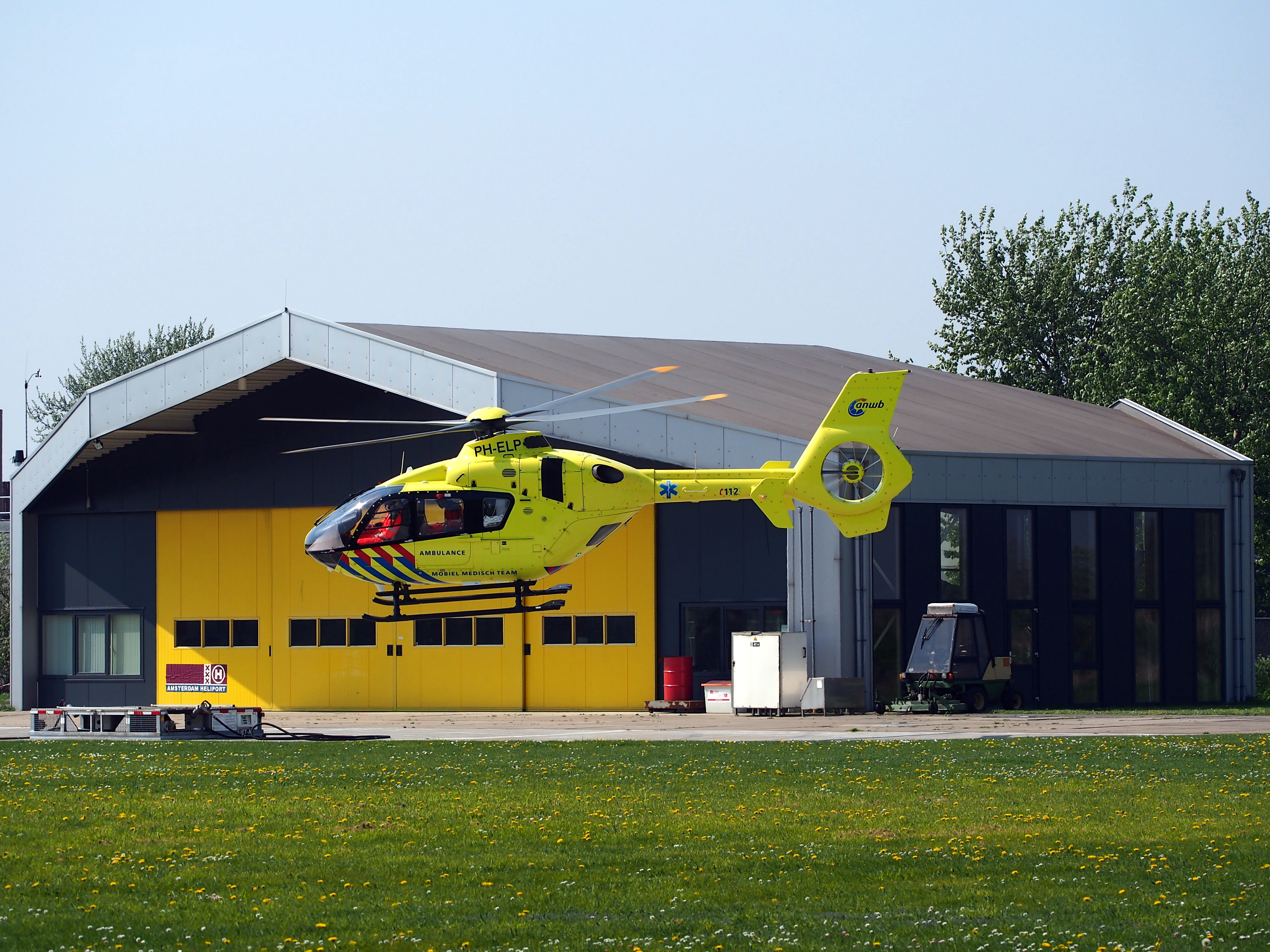
- ANWB Medevac helicopter at Amsterdam Heliport
- IATA: none; ICAO: EHHA

Summary
- Airport type: Public
- Operator: Amsterdam Heliport B.V
- Location: Amsterdam
- Elevation AMSL: 0 ft (0 m)
- Coordinates: 52°24′48″N 004°48′15″E
- Website: www.amsterdamheliport.com
- Interactive map of Amsterdam Heliport

Helipads
Number	Length		Surface
Number	m	ft	Surface
1	24	79
- Sources: AIP

The Amsterdam Heliport (Dutch: Amsterdam Helihaven) (ICAO: EHHA) is a small modern heliport located in the north west of Amsterdam, the Netherlands, in a harbour area known as the Westpoort. It provides parking space outside for four helicopters and hangar space for another three. The heliport was opened in 2005, aiming mainly at VIP transport and airwork. The main user of the heliport is Heli Holland. The Helicopter Emergency Medical Service (HEMS, Dutch: Mobiel medisch team, MMT) Lifeliner 1 is also stationed at Amsterdam Heliport.
