= Maasvlakte Heliport =

Coordinates: 51°57′34″N 004°05′24″E

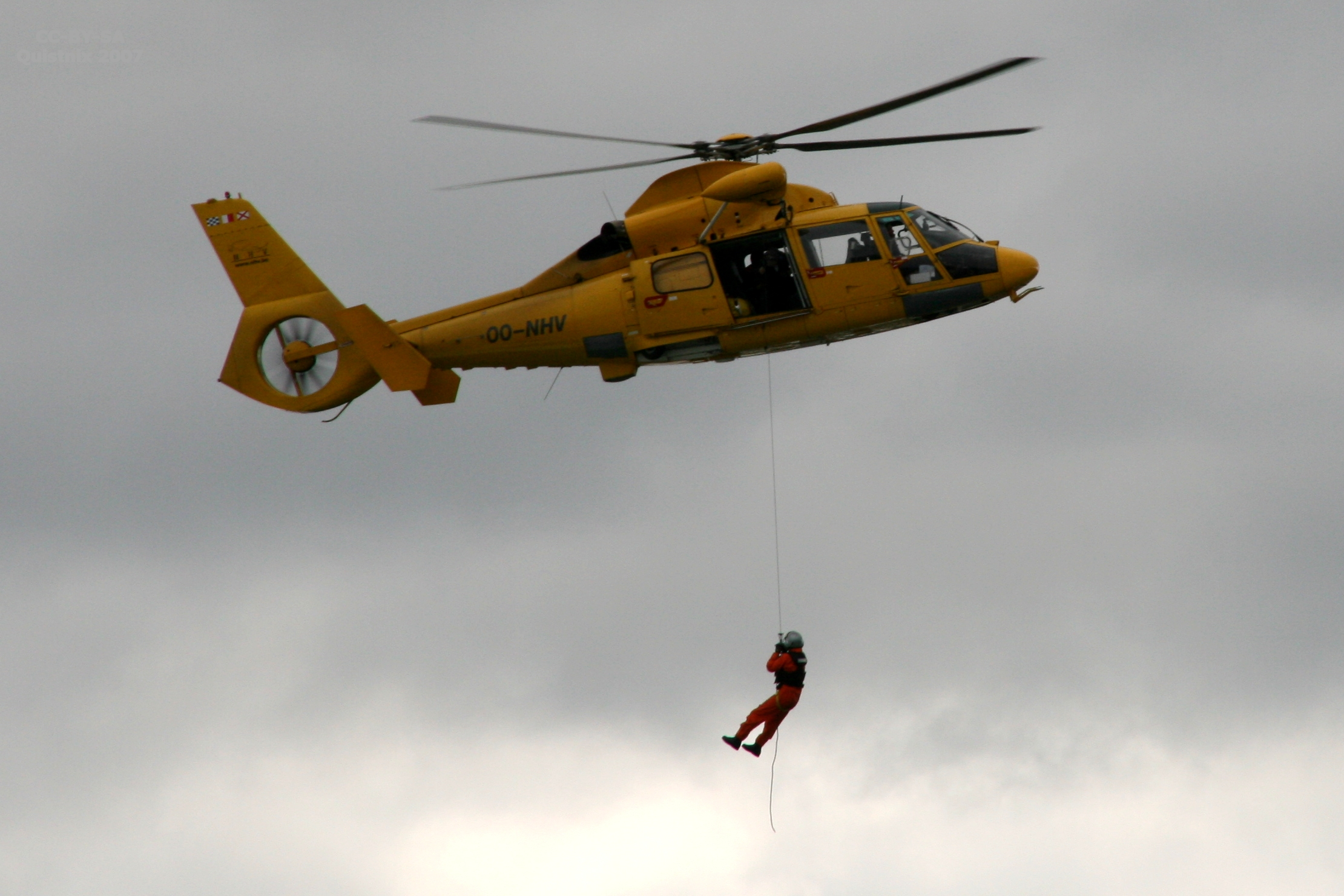
- IATA: none; ICAO: EHTP

Summary
- Airport type: Restricted
- Operator: Loodswezen
- Location: Rotterdam
- Elevation AMSL: 0 ft / 0 m
- Interactive map of Maasvlakte Heliport

Maasvlakte Heliport (or Pistoolhaven Heliport) is a small heliport in the Netherlands in the harbour area of the Maasvlakte in the city of Rotterdam. It is exclusively used for maritime piloting services. The heliport moved to a new location in 2007. The old location was on the western edge of the Maasvlakte near the coastline. Adjacent to the old heliport there was an ultralight airport which has now been closed.
