= Teuge =

- Village
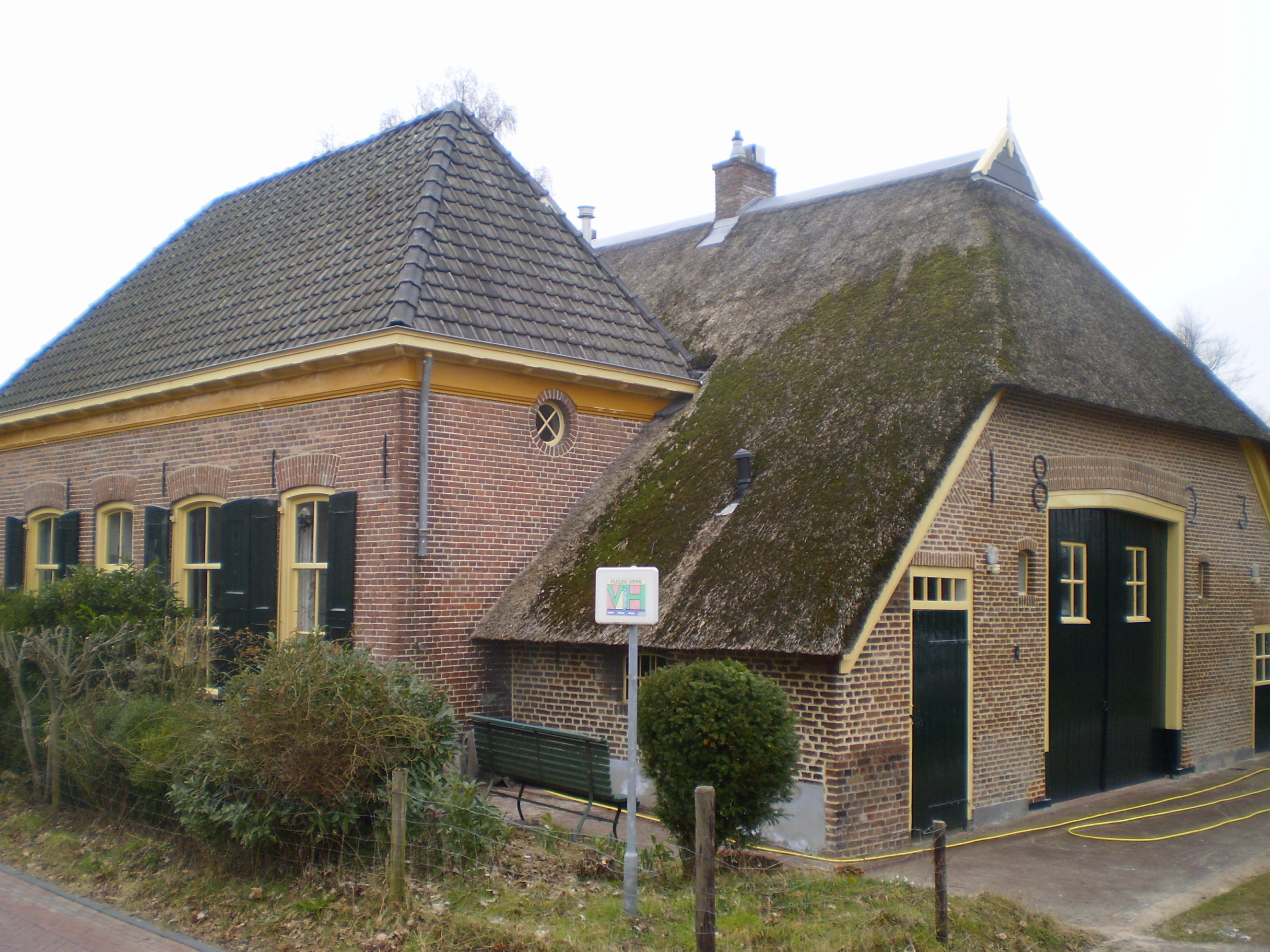
- Het Slyck, a monumental building in Teuge

- Flag

- Location in the province of Gelderland in the Netherlands Teuge (Netherlands)
- Coordinates: 52°14′14″N 6°2′56″E
- Country: Netherlands
- Province: Gelderland
- Municipality: Voorst

Area
  - Total: 7.98 km^{2} (3.08 sq mi)
- Elevation: 5 m (16 ft)

Population (2021)
  - Total: 900
  - Density: 110/km^{2} (290/sq mi)
- Time zone: UTC+1 (CET)
  - Summer (DST): UTC+2 (CEST)
- Postal code: 7395
- Dialing code: 0355

Teuge is a village in the Dutch province of Gelderland, between Apeldoorn and Deventer. It is part of the municipality of Voorst. Its population is around 800 people and it is best known for being the location of Teuge International Airport. The main access road is the N344. Since 2001, Ecotribe Teuge is a squatted former barracks.

== History ==
The village was first mentioned in 1333 or 1334 as "oppen Toghe". The etymology is unknown.

Teuge was home to 537 people in 1840. In 1935, Teuge Airport was constructed. The airport was enlarged by the Germans during World War II and an assembly hall was constructed for V-1 and V-2 flying bombs. In 1960s flight schools started to use the airport. In the 1950s, refugees from the Republic of South Maluku were housed in barracks near the village. In 1958, a wooden chapel was built by the Moluccans, however it was demolished in 1980.

== Gallery ==
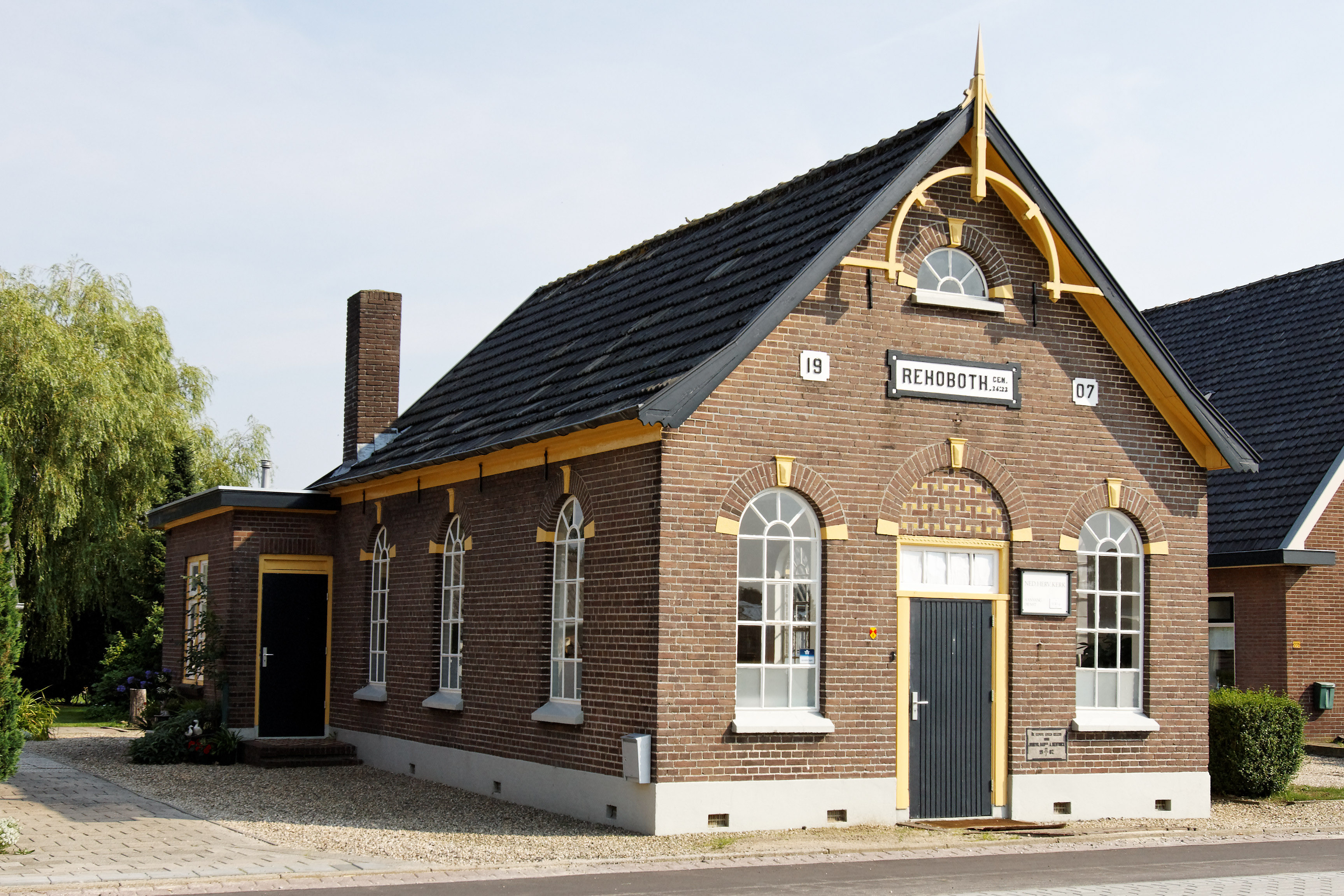
Rehoboth Kerk Teuge

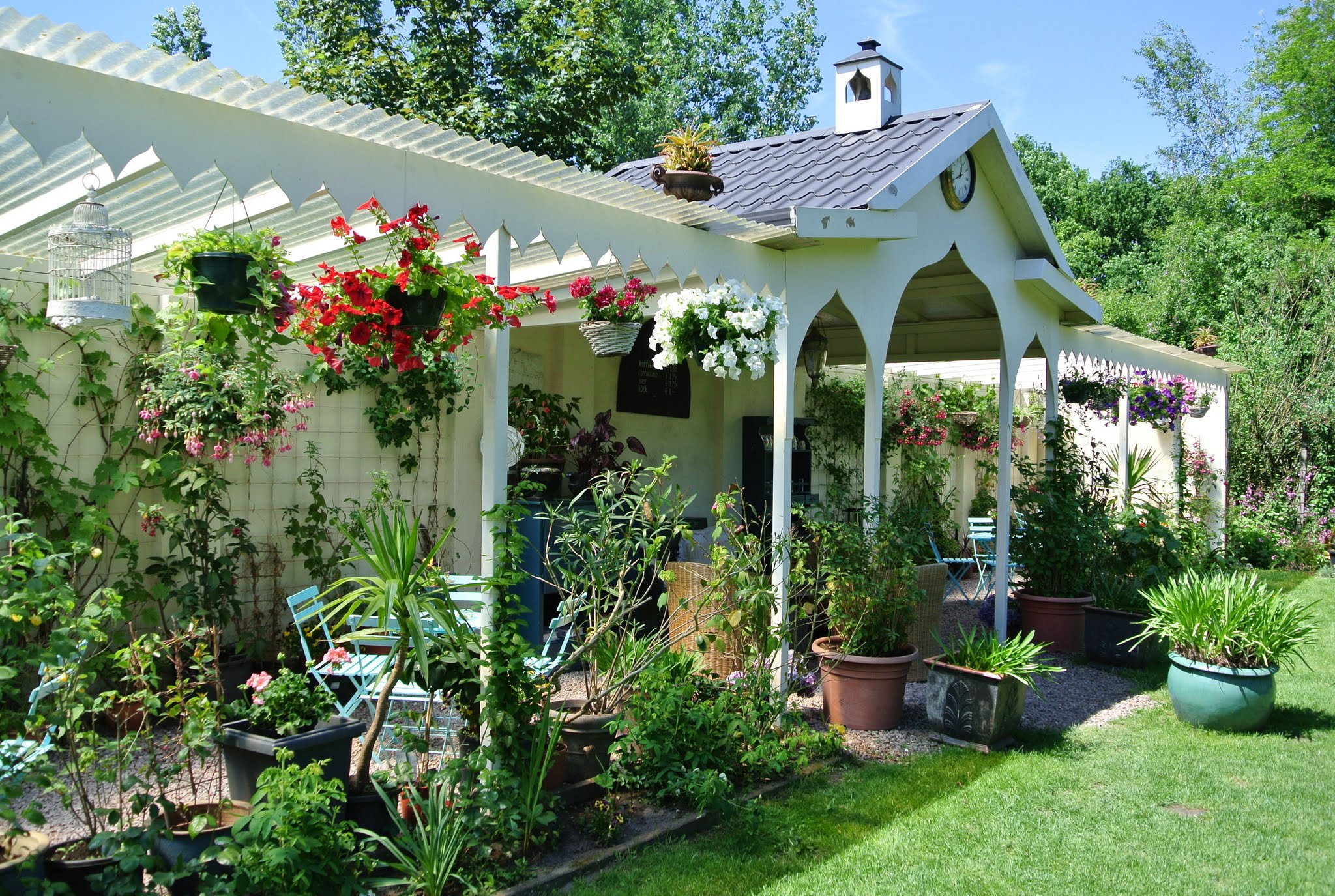
Groot Hontschoten

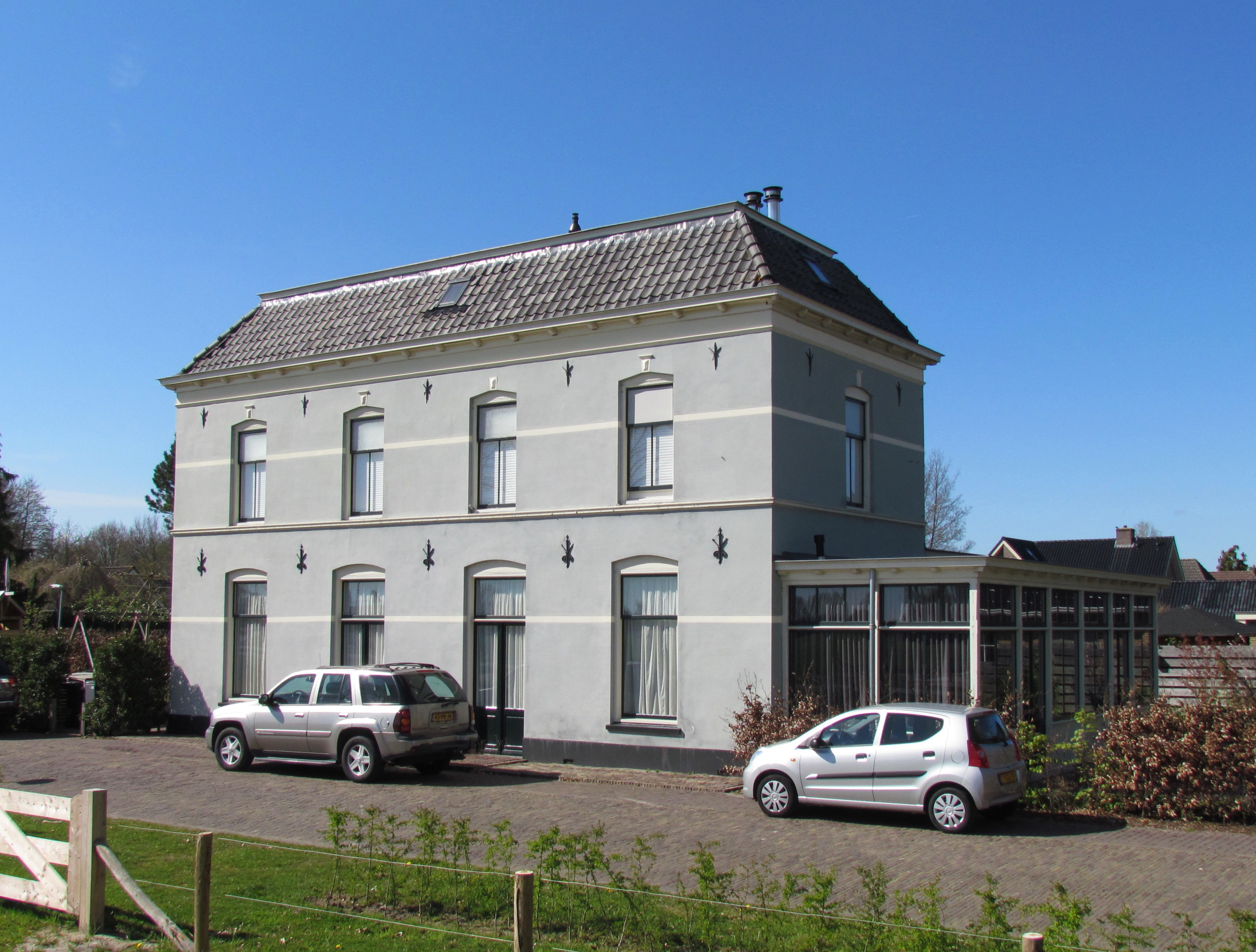
Former restaurant De Zwaan

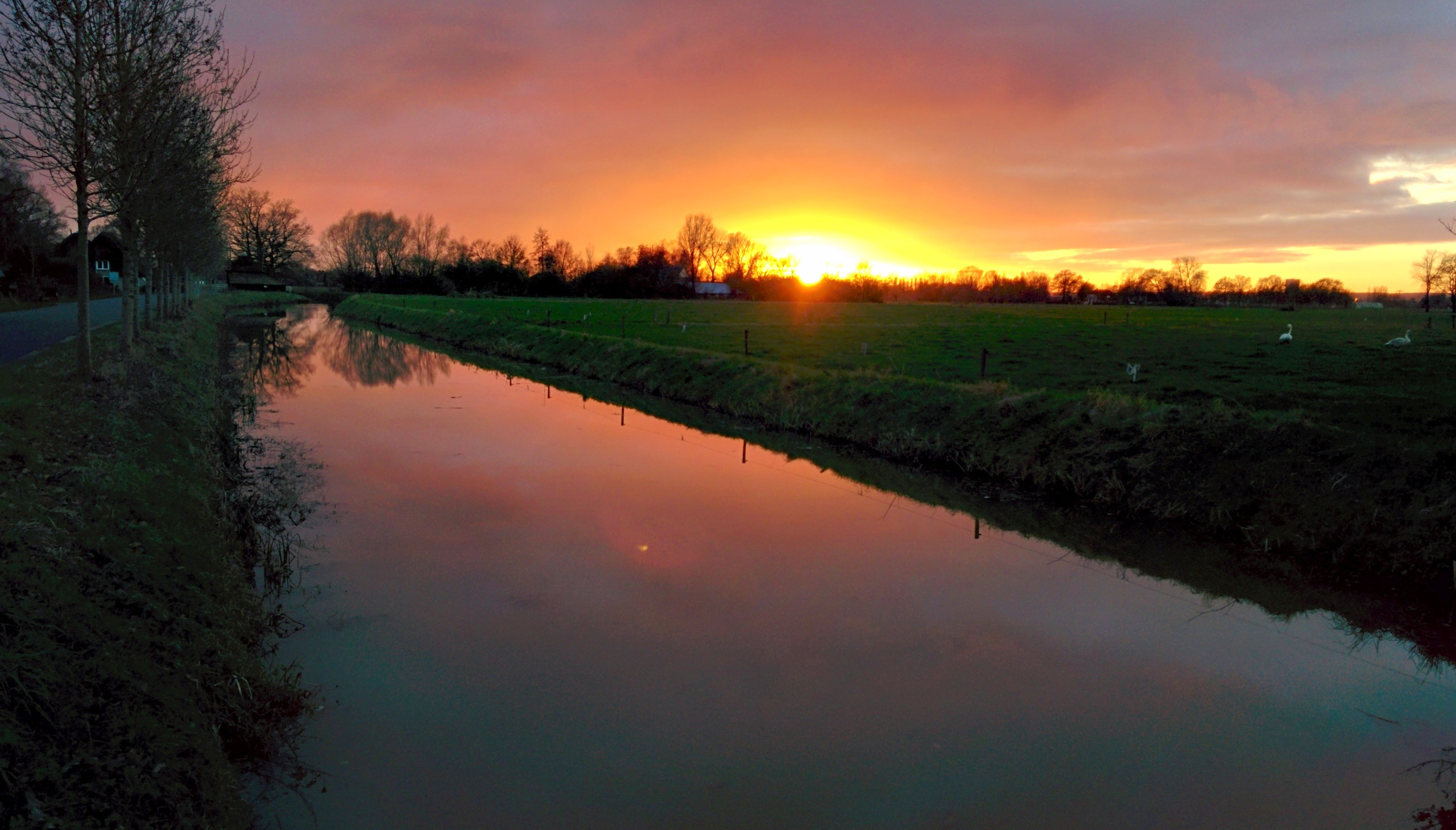
Sunset in Teuge
