= Heli Holland =

Dutch helicopter operator

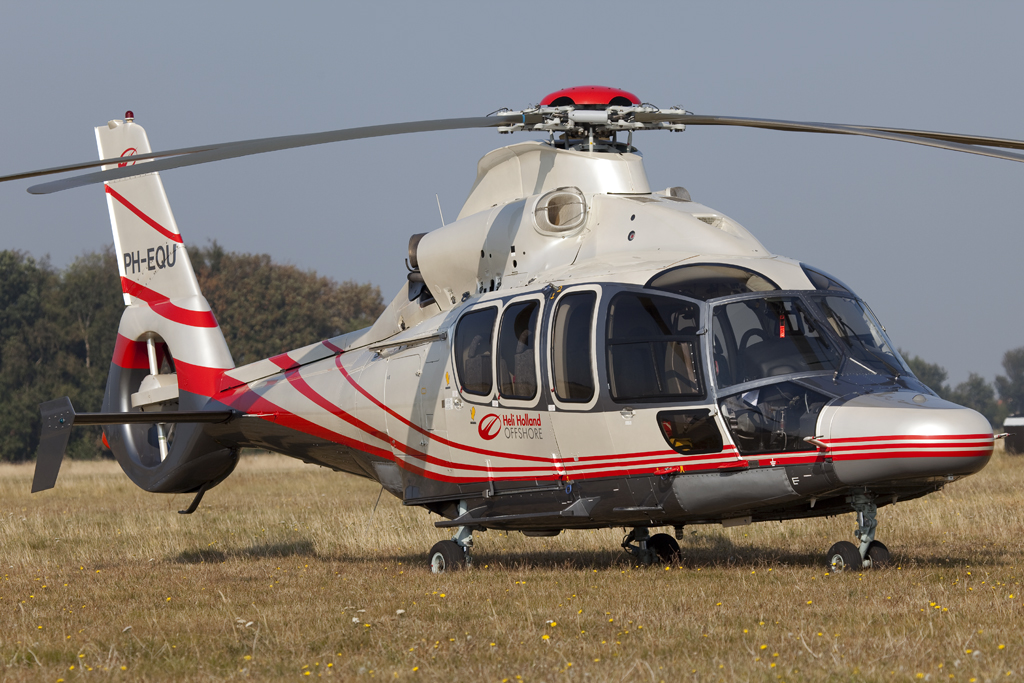
IATA	ICAO	Call sign
-	HHE	HELI HOLLAND
- Founded: 1976
- Hubs: Amsterdam Heliport, Lelystad Airport
- Fleet size: 20
- Headquarters: Emmer-Compascuum, Netherlands
- Website: https://www.heliholland.nl/

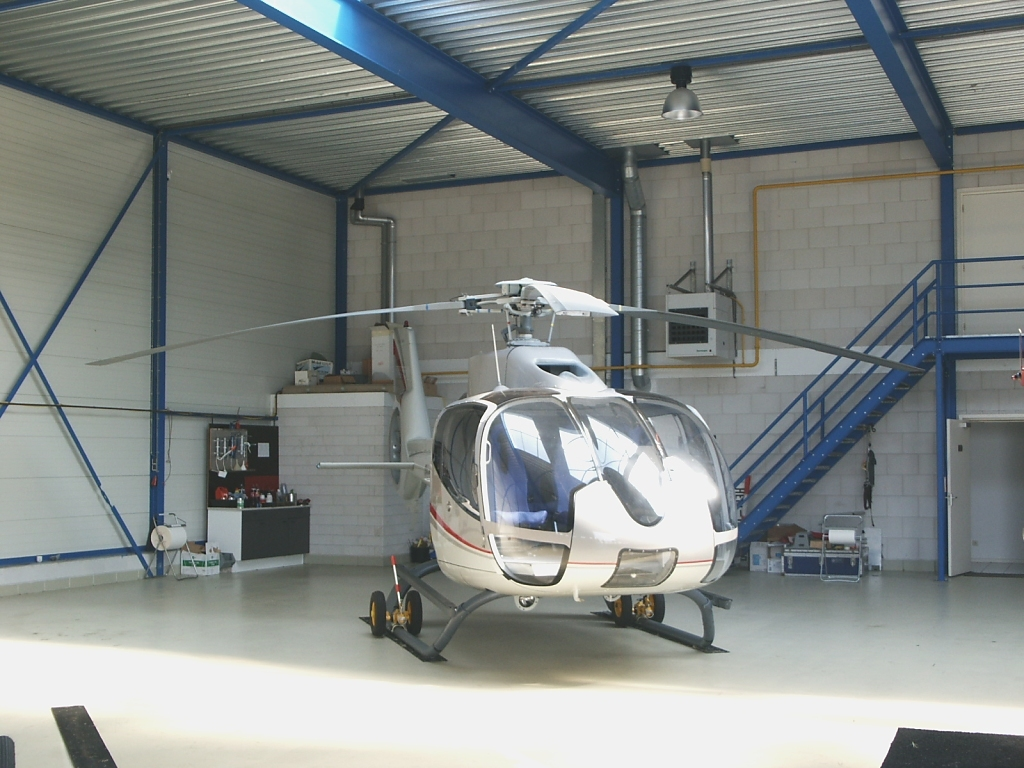
A Eurocopter EC 130 operated by Heli Holland in a hangar at Lelystad Airport

Heli Holland is a Dutch helicopter operator. Services provided include VIP transport, offshore transport, flight training, aerial photography, medical flights, freight transport and aerial inspection flights. It also performs helicopter maintenance and trading. Operating bases are Lelystad Airport, Amsterdam Heliport, Den Helder Airport, Gdansk Poland and a company owned heliport in Emmer-Compascuum, which is also the location of the company's head office and base maintenance facilities. It is the largest helicopter operator in the Netherlands.

== Fleet ==
Fleet as per July 2023:

- Cessna 402B (1x)
- Airbus H175 (1x)
- Eurocopter EC 155B1 (3x)
- Eurocopter EC 155B (3x in long term storage)
- Eurocopter EC 130 (1x)
- Eurocopter EC 120 (6x)
- Eurocopter AS355 (3x)
- Bell 206 Long Ranger (1x)
- Bell 206 Jet Ranger (1x)
- Schweizer / Hughes 300 (3x)
- Schweizer 330 (2x)
