= Air Operations Control Station Nieuw-Milligen =

- IATA: none; ICAO: EHMC / EHML

Summary
- Airport type: Military
- Owner: Royal Netherlands Air Force
- Elevation AMSL: 92 ft / 28 m
- Coordinates: 52°14′07″N 005°45′00″E
- Website: Air Operations Control Station Nieuw Milligen
- Interactive map of Air Operations Control Station Nieuw-Milligen

The Air Operations Control Station Nieuw-Milligen (AOCS NM) of the Royal Netherlands Air Force is located near Nieuw-Milligen (in the municipality of Apeldoorn).

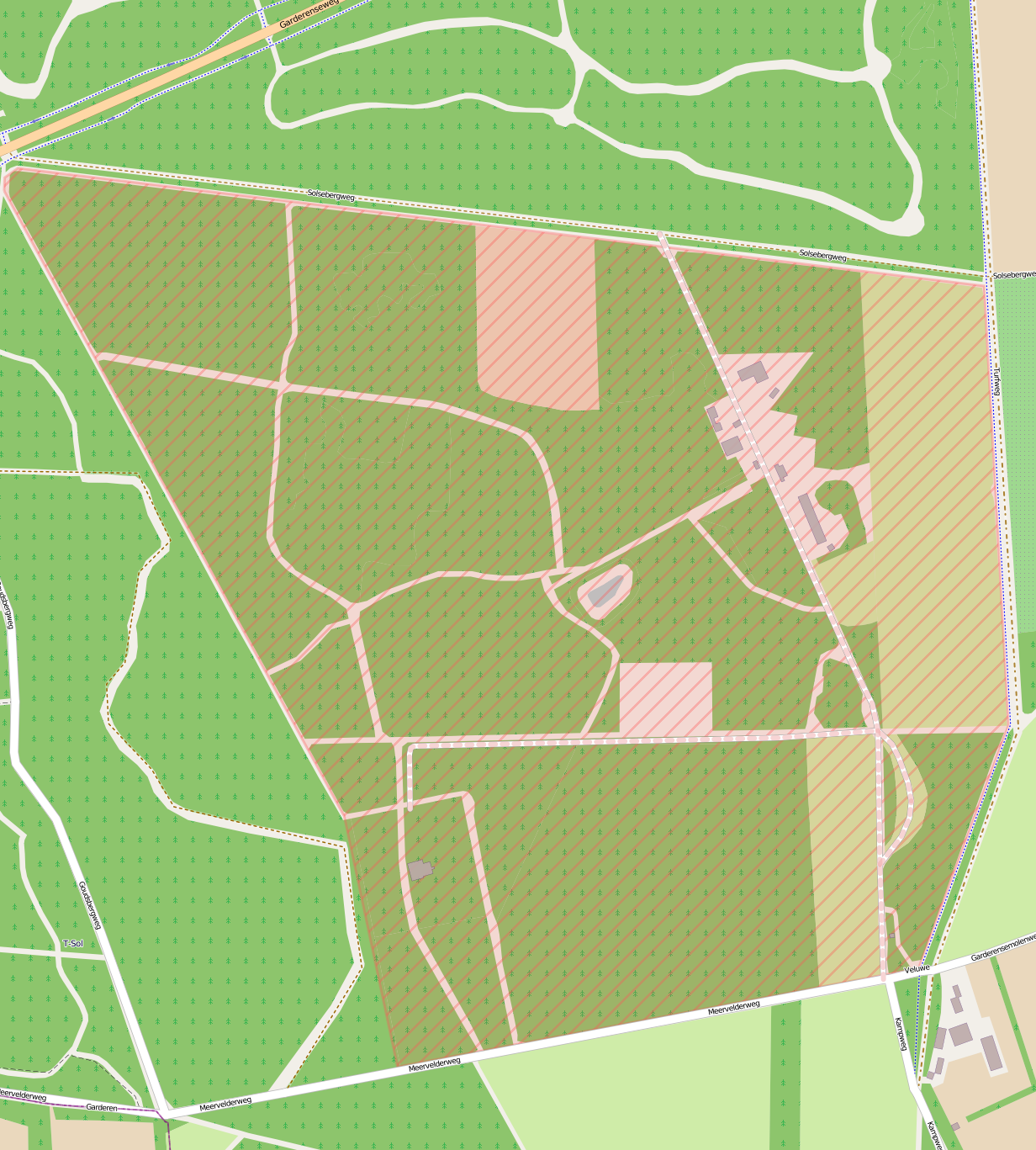
OpenStreetMap of the base.

It is home to:

- the 710th Sqn. Control & Reporting Centre Squadron (CRC)
- the 711th Sqn. Air Traffic Control Squadron (MilATCC, i.e. Military Air Traffic Control Centre)

It is the air traffic control centre for all military air traffic in the Netherlands, as well as the centre for Air Battle Management, Air Surveillance, Fighter and SAM Control, and Alerting. Air traffic control and information service is also provided to civilian traffic operating within its airspace. AOCS NM uses DutchMil as its callsign for air traffic control services, and Bandbox as a callsign for the military Control and Reporting Centre (CRC).

The base started out as a remount facility in 1860 as Kamp Nieuw-Milligen. A small military airstrip was added to the base in 1913, primarily for diversions, and this remained in use as such until 1940, when it was destroyed by the Dutch military to prevent it from being used by the Germans. The runway was not rebuilt after the war, but there is a helipad, located on the north side of the base.

The ICAO codes refer to the ATC and CRC units, not the helipad.

On 2 April 2024 it was announced that the Medium Power Radar (MPR) had been retired after being in service for 52 years.
