= Teuge Airfield =

Aerodrome in the Netherlands

Teuge Airfield Vliegveld Teuge
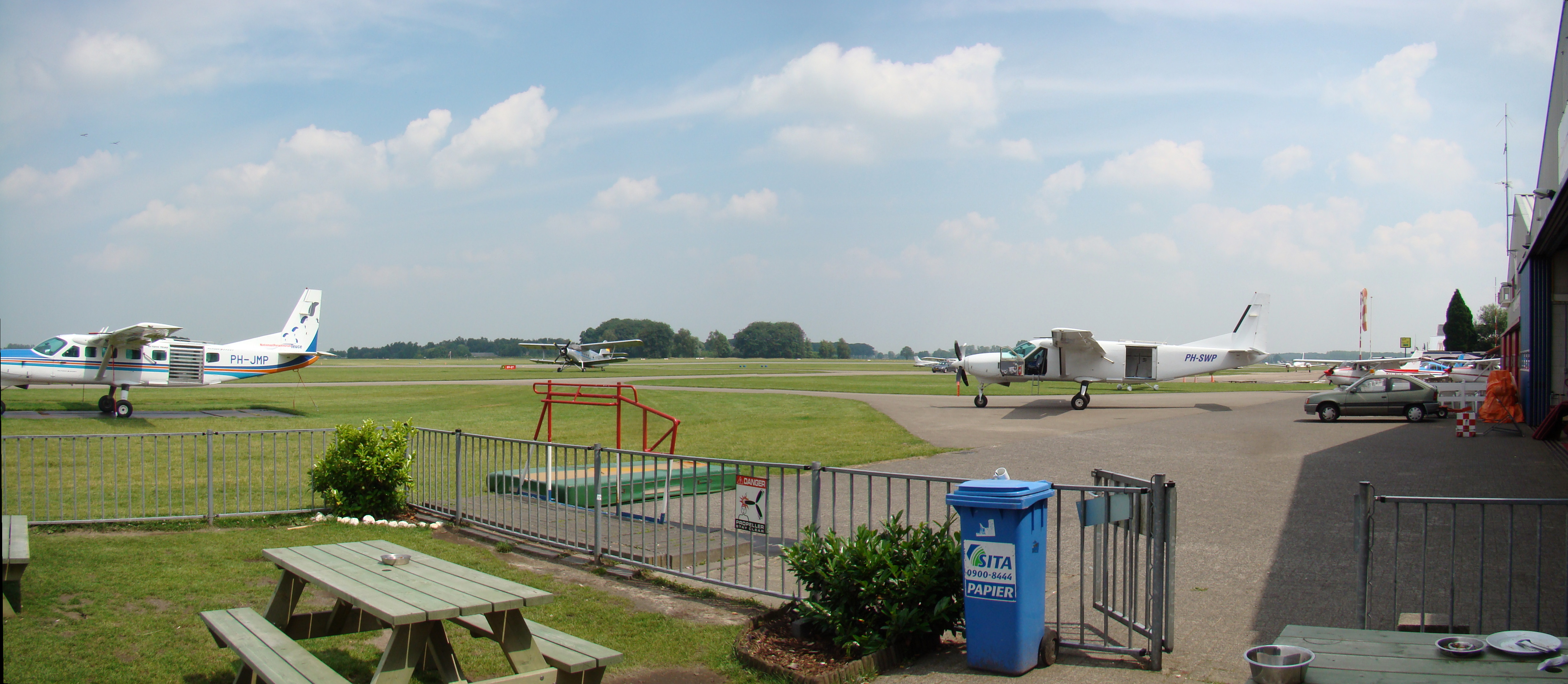
- Two Cessna 208B aircraft at the airport
- IATA: none; ICAO: EHTE

Summary
- Airport type: Public
- Operator: N.V. Luchthaven Teuge
- Serves: Deventer/Apeldoorn, Netherlands
- Location: Teuge, Voorst, Netherlands
- Elevation AMSL: 17 ft / 5 m
- Coordinates: 52°14′41″N 006°02′48″E
- Website: www.teuge-airport.nl

Map
- Location of EHTE

Runways
| Direction | Length | | Surface |
| Direction | m | ft | Surface |
|---|---|---|---|
| 08/26 | 1,199 | 3,934 | Concrete/Asphalt |
- Source: AIP from AIS the Netherlands

Teuge Airfield (Dutch: Vliegveld Teuge) or Teuge International Airport (ICAO: EHTE) is a general aviation airfield 4.5 nautical miles (8.3 km; 5.2 mi) west from Deventer and 3.5 nautical miles (6.5 km; 4.0 mi) northeast from Apeldoorn. It is located in the village of Teuge, part of the Voorst municipality in the province of Gelderland in the Netherlands.

The airfield has a single runway, oriented 08/26 with a length of 1,199 m (3,934 ft). A second runway, aligned 03/21, existed up to 2012. It saw limited use and was closed when the land on the north side of the airport was sold. Next to general aviation, the airfield is also used extensively for skydiving and glider flying. Though no scheduled international flights take place from the airport, customs services are available upon request, hence it is still designated an international airport.

Several companies at the airport specialise in aerial photography, and it is the home airfield of aerobatics pilot Frank Versteegh, a former Red Bull Air Race participant.

== History and future ==
The airfield was constructed for civilian use in 1935. During World War II, it was used by the German Luftwaffe. Under their control, the airfield was improved and expanded; however, it did not see much use. According to historical records, the Royal Air Force used Teuge as an Advanced Landing Ground with designation B-95. After the war, it was returned to civilian control.

Runway 08/26 was entirely resurfaced and expanded from 700 m (2,297 ft) to the current length of 1,199 m (3,934 ft) in 2007. Various improvements were scheduled for the year 2013; runway lighting was to be added, a GPS approach was to be made available and construction was to be started on a new airport operations building.
