= Nieuw-Milligen =

- Hamlet
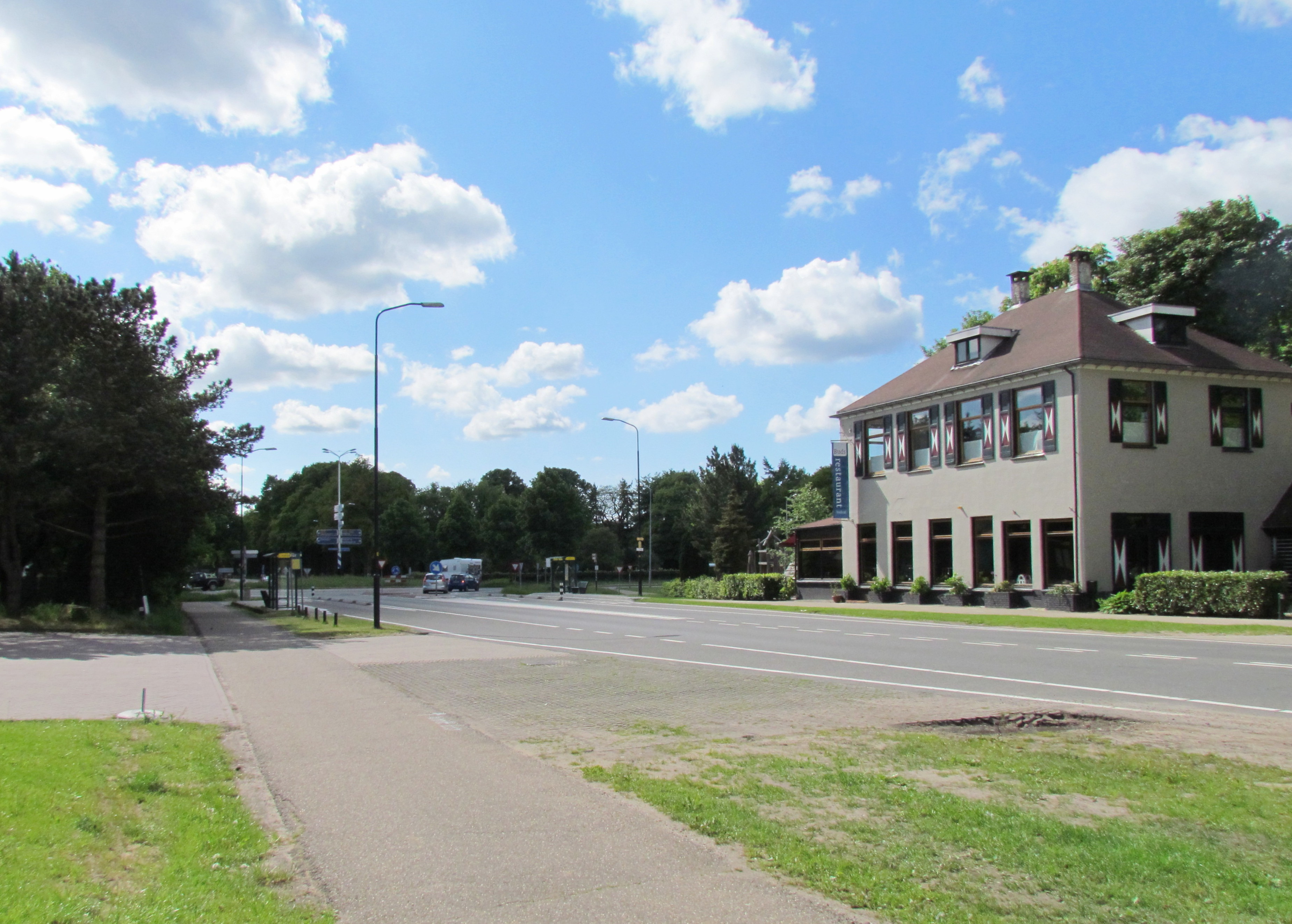

- Location in the province of Gelderland Nieuw-Milligen (Netherlands)
- Coordinates: 52°13′15″N 5°46′43″E
- Country: Netherlands
- Province: Gelderland
- Municipality: Apeldoorn

Area
  - Total: 15.91 km^{2} (6.14 sq mi)
- Elevation: 34 m (112 ft)

Population (2021)
  - Total: 105
  - Density: 6.60/km^{2} (17.1/sq mi)
- Time zone: UTC+1 (CET)
  - Summer (DST): UTC+2 (CEST)
- Postal code: 3888
- Dialing code: 055

Nieuw-Milligen is a hamlet in the municipality of Apeldoorn in the province of Gelderland, the Netherlands. Nieuw-Milligen is best known for Air Operations Control Station Nieuw-Milligen, a military air traffic control centre in the Netherlands. The base started out as a small military airfield in 1913 and remained in use as such until 1940, when it was destroyed by the Dutch military to prevent it from being used by the Germans. It is also home to a Landal Greenparks holiday village.

It was first mentioned in 1849 as Nieuw Milligen to differentiate from Millingen which has become Oud-Milligen. The name means "settlement of people of Milo (person)".
