= Groningen Airport Eelde =

Airport near Eelde, Drenthe, Netherlands

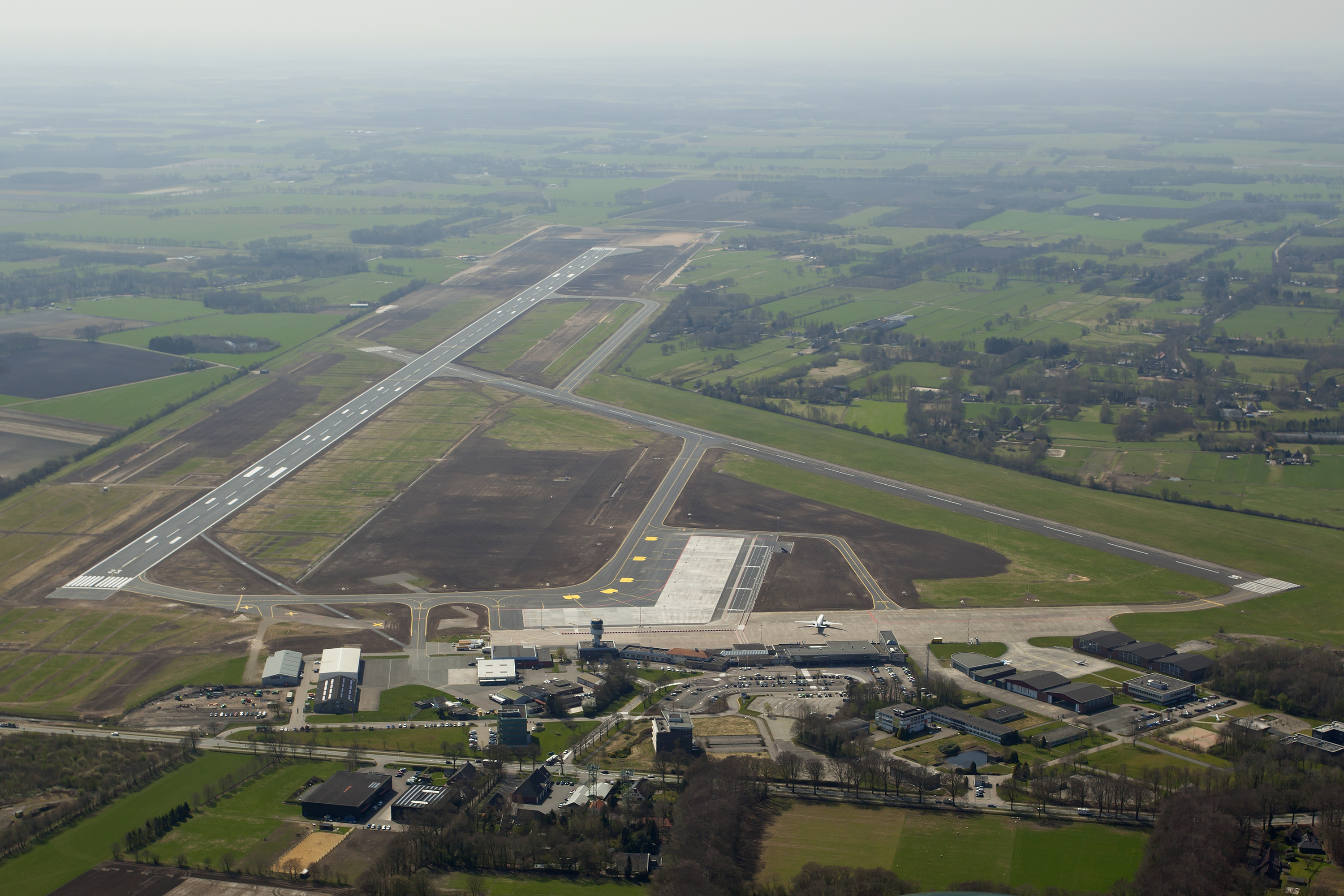
- IATA: GRQ; ICAO: EHGG

Summary
- Airport type: Public
- Operator: Groningen Airport Eelde NV
- Serves: Groningen
- Location: Eelde, Drenthe, Netherlands
- Opened: 23 May 1931; 95 years ago
- Elevation AMSL: 5 m (16 ft)
- Coordinates: 53°07′30″N 06°35′00″E
- Website: www.groningenairport.nl

Map
- Location in the Netherlands

Runways
Direction	Length		Surface
Direction	m	ft	Surface
05/23	2,500	8,202	Asphalt
01/19 (closed)	1,500	4,921	Asphalt

Statistics (2017)
- Passengers: 242,000 ▲
- Aircraft movements: 27,000 ▲
- Source: AIP from AIS the Netherlands, CBS Statistics Netherlands

Groningen Airport Eelde (IATA: GRQ, ICAO: EHGG) is a minor international airport in the northeastern Netherlands. It is located near Eelde in the Province of Drenthe, 4.8 nautical miles (8.9 km; 5.5 mi) south of the city of Groningen in the province of Groningen. In 2015, the airport handled 220,710 passengers. The airport is also the home base of the KLM Flight Academy, Noord Nederlandse Aero Club (NNAC) and General Enterprises.

The airport started under the name "Hakenkampsveld" in 1928 and was officially opened in 1931. It was renamed "Luchthaven Eelde" in 1933. During World War II, the German military occupied the airport. Since 1958, there have been European destinations from the airport. Since 1988, the airport has been called Groningen Airport Eelde.

== History ==
=== 1920s–1930s ===
Groningen Airport Eelde's (GAE) history can be traced back to 1927, when Hayo Hindriks, an ex-alderman of the municipality Eelde, approached KLM (without informing the community's council). He knew that the KLM would be interested in an air link between Rotterdam, Amsterdam and Groningen.

On 13 July 1928 the community's council agreed on a proposal to allocate the 'Hakenkampsveld', a 12 hectare terrain within the municipality of Eelde, as an airport. The airport was officially opened by mayor Jan Gerard Legro on 23 May 1931. 40,000 visitors watched the air show, which was held to celebrate the opening. On 15 August that year the first scheduled service between Eelde and Amsterdam/Schiphol started, which did not appear to be viable.

In 1933, the airport's name was changed to " NV Luchthaven Eelde". Stockholders were the provinces of Groningen and Drenthe, the municipalities of Groningen, Eelde and Assen and the Chambers of Commerce and Factories for Groningen, Drenthe and the peat-colonies. Now there was money to expand the airport. At that time the airport's area covered 12 hectares. A new service between the airport and Amsterdam/Schiphol was set up.

=== 1940s: During and after World War II ===
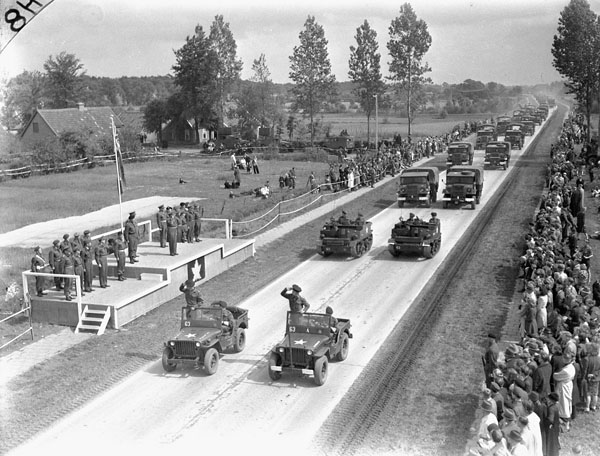
The Irish Regiment of Canada salutes General Crerar during a review at the airport in 1945.

During World War II, between 1940 and 1945, the airport was occupied by the German military. However, its hangars were completely destroyed by Dutch soldiers on their retreat. The occupation was a severe blow to the airport's promising expectations, but the airport played an important role in the war. During the occupation, the airport was considerably expanded by the Germans. Many hangars were built and the apron was expanded to accommodate fighter aircraft.

In early 1945, the Germans abandoned their "Fliegerhorst". During the German retreat, a member of the local resistance, W.W. Krijthe, prevented the airport from being blown up, by cutting the explosives' ignition wires. In the summer of 1945 Canadian soldiers used the airport to store vehicles of the 5th Canadian (Armoured) Division. The Canadians called the site "Finitocamp".

The airfield returned to NV Luchtvaartterrein Noord-Nederland. The national government shouldered most of the cost of restoring the damaged drainage system in the airfield. The government subsidized further developments at the airport so that it could meet international standards and remain registered for aviation.

The airport was appointed as an alternative airport for flights bound for Amsterdam/Schiphol in 1948. To cater for these deviating aircraft, a new base plan had to be designed for the levelling and drainage of the runways (with an 1,800 metres long main runway and a secondary runway measuring 1,500 metres), taxiways and apron. The new runways were finally ready for service in 1953, making the site an official aerodrome.

=== 1950s ===
On 16 August 1954 the Rijksluchtvaartschool (RLS) – or National Aviation Academy in English – moved to the airport from Gilze-Rijen. The KLM would acquire ownership of the RLS in 1991, becoming the KLM Flight Academy. In the course of the next two years after 1954, a flight theory school, the secondary and final flight education as well as other branches transferred to Eelde, making the airport an important aviation training site.

In 1956, the airport was renamed as "Luchthaven Eelde NV". The official opening of the airport building complex took place the following year on 15 May, by Prince Bernard.

The first landing of a European aeroplane took place on 13 July 1958. Twelve passengers boarded the aircraft, making a trip to Mallorca for a fourteen-day vacation. In the same year, a new air traffic control tower was put into use.

=== 1960s–1970s ===
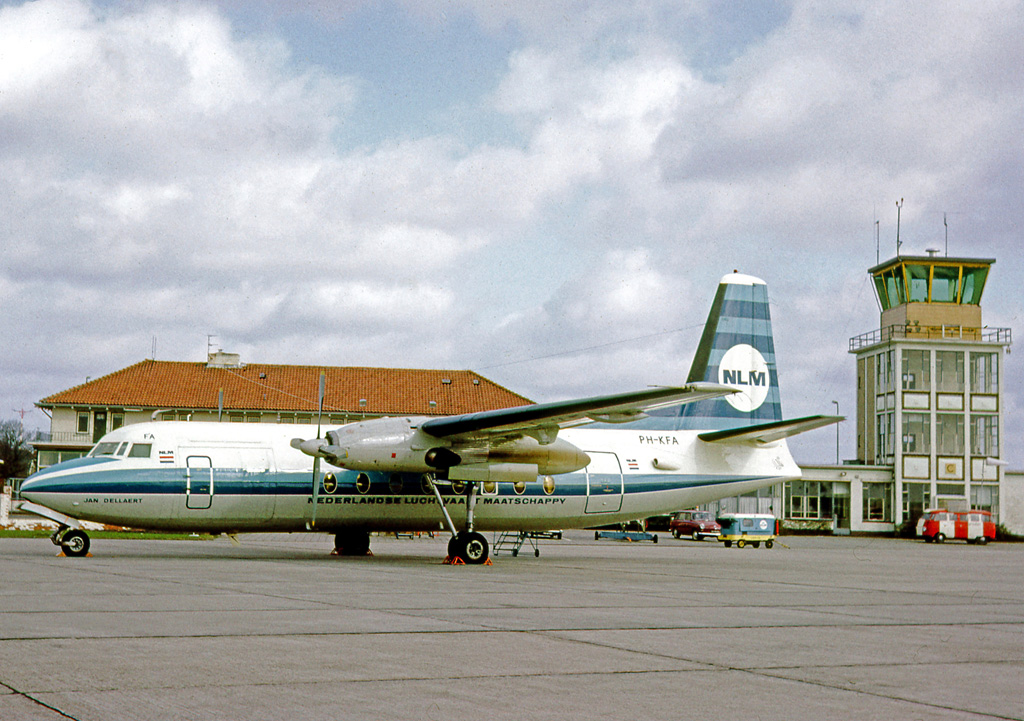
An NLM Fokker F.27 Friendship on a domestic flight in March 1967 showing the terminal, control tower and other facilities

During the 1960s, scheduled services were restored, initially, national flights operated by NLM. The airfield was seen to have the potential to operate usefully as a regional airport and to play a role in the infrastructure of the northern part of the Netherlands. The Study Committee for the Development of Eelde Airport was established. The committee suggested taking a closer look at regional airports in other countries and seeing how they had developed. Eelde Airport seemed to be a key part of a larger system of infrastructure in the region. Another finding was that aircraft noise was a bigger problem at Eelde than at similar airports. Therefore, a noise pollution committee was established.

In 1977, a new passenger terminal opened and more parking space for cars was constructed. Adding to this, a bus link to the city of Groningen was established, improving the airport's accessibility. Work started to expand the apron and add a hangar. In the same year, the Dutch Ministry of Infrastructure and the Environment published the Structural Plan for Civil Aerodromes. This plan stated that an expansion of the main runway by 500 metres should be undertaken. This would make flights of all aircraft types possible.

=== 1980s–1990s ===
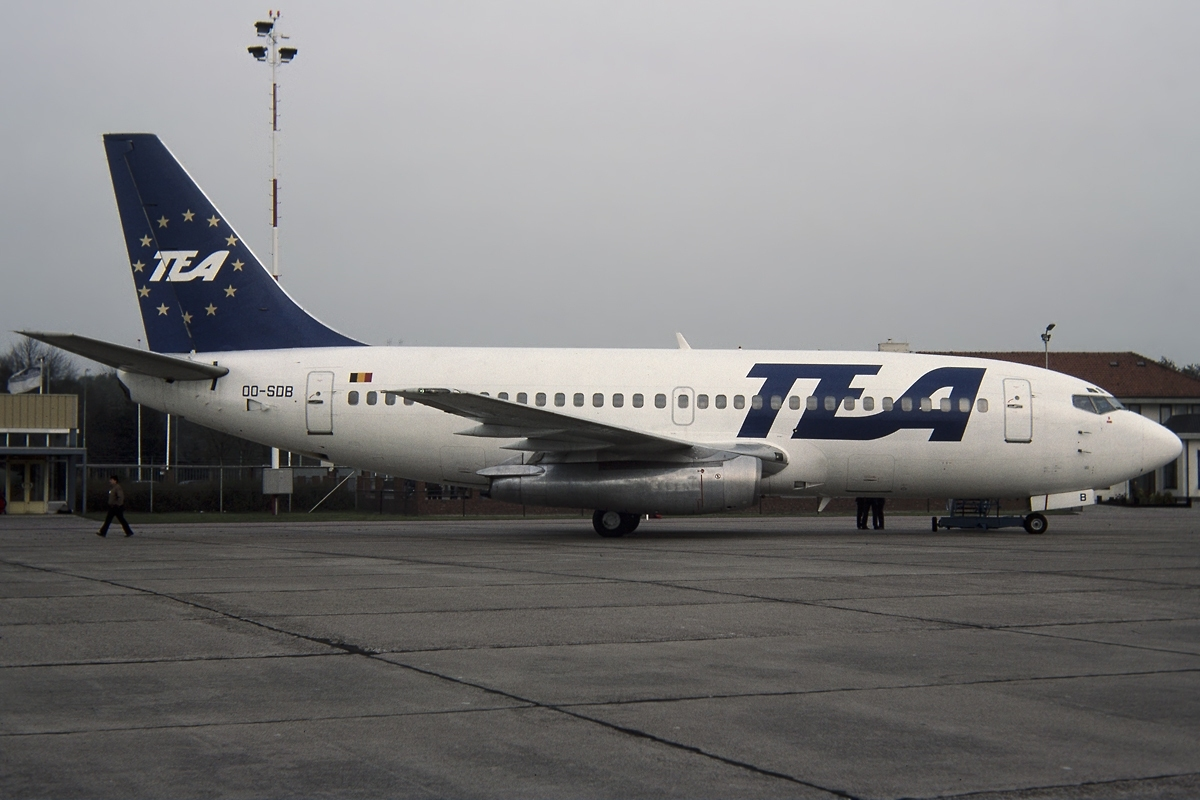
Boeing 737-229 of Trans European Airways at the airport in 1988

From 1979 to 1982, the buildings housing the State Aviation Service (Rijksluchtvaartdienst) and the meteorological service were modernised. A new air traffic control tower was constructed.

The aerodrome's name was changed once again in 1988, becoming officially "Groningen Airport Eelde NV". This was decided because the airport's international significance had steadily increased over the years.

With the airport becoming more crowded due to holiday flights, it was decided to join the two existing passenger halls together. This created a single departure hall capable of holding 200 passengers. The merge also resulted in an arrivals hall with a conveyor belt. A new car park was added as well. Groningen Airport Eelde received a sum of 2.5 million guilders for a new passage hall. This sum was donated by the European support fund ISP, which was granted by the province of Drenthe. This would finance almost one-third of the costs of the new hall.

In 1997, the Dutch government planned to stop financial support to most regional airports. Despite this, the airport was still entitled to 25 million guilders (about 11.3 million euros) for the expansion of its main runway. On 12 November 1999 the government agreed with the proposal to extend the runway, provided that the flying of training circuits by large aircraft be terminated.

=== 2000s–2010s ===
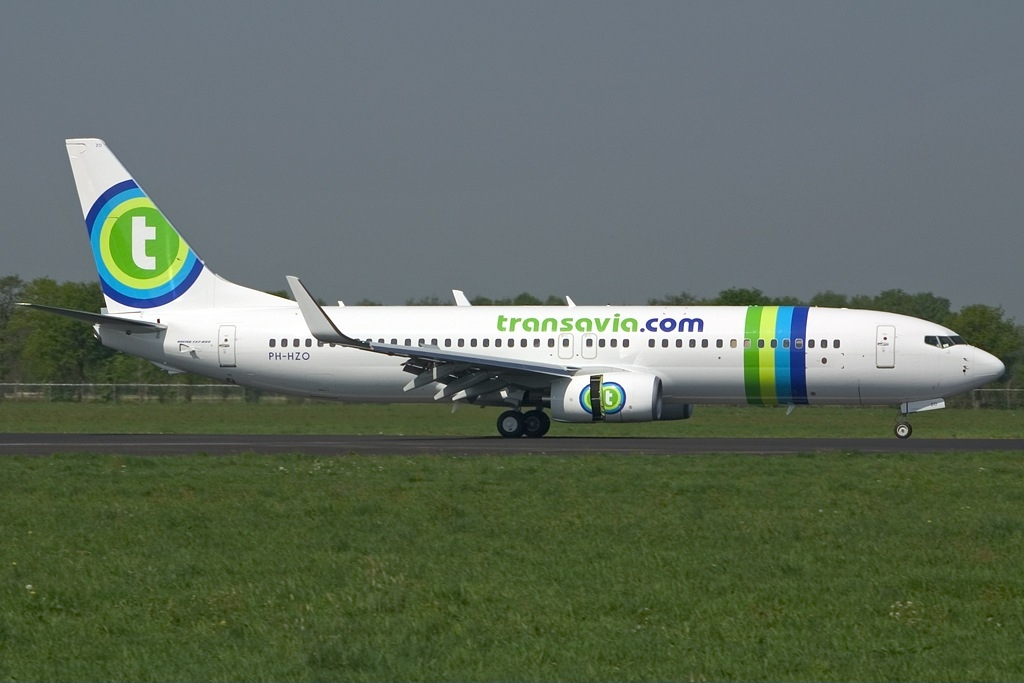
Transavia Boeing 737-800 in 2007

In April 2000, the majority of the Dutch parliament had no objection against the runway extension, but due to changing environmental legislation and civil objection procedures, it would take 12 more years until the project was actually started.

The province's council gave the final go-ahead for the runway extension on 15 February 2012 and the extended runway was put into service on 24 April 2013.

Prior to the runway extension, Ryanair had operated a scheduled service to London Stansted in 2003. This service attracted many passengers to the airport. Ryanair terminated the service in May 2004. One reason for this was the limited length of the main runway, limiting the aircraft's effective range and maximum load. Upon the opening of the new runway, Ryanair announced three new routes, returning to the airport after eight years. However, Ryanair did not operate from Eelde for long, the last flight being in November 2014.

In June 2014, UK low-cost carrier Flybe commenced a new year-round service to London-Southend. From March 2018 this service was greatly expanded, from six to 18 flights per week prior to Flybe entering administration and ceasing operations in 2020.

On 19 September 2016, Nordica started operating two flights a day between Groningen and Copenhagen. In November 2018, Nordica announced it would close its base in Groningen by December, shutting down the year-round routes to Copenhagen and Munich as well as seasonal services to Ibiza and Nice.

On 4 March 2019, flights to Copenhagen resumed, now carried out by AIS Airlines with 19-seat BAe Jetstream 32 aircraft, however these routes are no longer active

== Runways ==
Groningen Airport Eelde has two asphalt paved runways but only runway 05/23 is in use. It measures 2,500 m × 45 m (8,202 ft × 148 ft), which was extended from 1,800 meters in 2013. Only runway 23 has a DME/ILS (localizer at 109,9 MHz, no markers).

== Airlines and destinations ==
The following airlines operate regular scheduled and charter flights to and from Groningen:

Airlines	Destinations
AirBaltic	Seasonal: Tenerife-South
AlbaStar	Seasonal charter: Palma de Mallorca
Aurigny	Guernsey
BH Air	Seasonal charter: Burgas
BRA Braathens Regional Airlines	Seasonal charter: Sälen-Trysil
Corendon Dutch Airlines	Seasonal: Antalya, Dalaman, Gazipaşa, Heraklion, Hurghada, Rhodes
Emerald Airlines	Seasonal charter: Knock
LYGG	Charter: Esbjerg, Norwich
Sky Alps	Seasonal: Bolzano (begins 26 April 2027)
Transavia	Seasonal charter: Sälen-Trysil, Östersund
TUI fly Netherlands	Gran Canaria; Seasonal: Antalya, Kos, Palma de Mallorca

== Statistics ==
=== Annual passenger and aircraft movements ===
From CBS Statistics Netherlands and annual reports Groningen Airport Eelde

Year	Aircraft movements (change)	Passengers (change)	Passengers (change) [inclusive transfer]
1997	85,781	83,151	
1998	88,980 (▲ +4.0%)	114,160 (▲+37.3%)	113,119 (▲ +30.4%)
1999	81,879 (▼ -8.0%)	90,168 (▼-21.0%)	110,059 (▼ -2.7%)
2000	69,054 (▼-15.7%)	78,266 (▼-13.2%)	112,367 (▲ +2.1%)
2001	61,324 (▼-11.2%)	94,220 (▲+20.4%)	132,155 (▲ +17.6%)
2002	67,783 (▲+10.5%)	107,466 (▲+14.1%)	148,291 (▲ +12.2%)
2003	54,890 (▼-19.0%)	137,607 (▲+28.0%)	177,851 (▲ +20.0%)
2004	43,146 (▼-21.4%)	119,218 (▼-13.4%)	155,534 (▼ -12.6%)
2005	44,925 (▲ +4.1%)	122,794 (▲ +3.0%)	162,875 (▲ +4.7%)
2006	54,843 (▲+22.1%)	129,012 (▲ +5.1%)	166,240 (▲ +2.1%)
2007	59,406 (▲ +8.3%)	135,726 (▲ +5.2%)	172,458 (▲ +3.7%)
2008	61,322 (▲ +3.2%)	148,949 (▲ +9.7%)	190,034 (▲ +10.2%)
2009	65,617 (▲ +7.0%)	136,044 (▼ -8.7%)	167,107 (▼ -12.1%)
2010	63,866 (▼ -2.7%)	122,659 (▼ -9.8%)	153,637 (▼ -8.1%)
2011	52,774 (▼ -17.3%)	114,327 (▼ -6.8%)	148,850 (▼ -3.2%)
2012	46,418 (▼ -12.0%)	180,812 (▲ +58.2%)	208,669 (▲ +40.2%)
2013	43,836 (▼ -5.7%)	176,212 (▼ -2.5%)	201,721 (▼ -3.3%)
2014	38,951 (▼ -11.1%)	169,369 (▼ -3.9%)	199,646 (▼ -1.0%)
2015	23,456 (▼ -39.8%)	180,879 (▲ +6.8%)	220,710 (▲ +10.6%)
2016	24,746 (▲ +5.5%)	152,451 (▼ +15.7%)	180,399 (▼ -18.2%)
2017	27,005 (▲ +8.4%)	201,786 (▲ +49.6%)	227,982 (▲ +26.4%)
2018	21,694 (▼ -19.7%)	228,698 (▲ +13.5%)	241,737 (▲ +6%)
2019	31,420 (▲ +44.8%)	no data	186,988 (▼ -22.6%)
2020	39,387 (▲ +25.4%)	no data	19,004 (▼ -89.8%)

== Ground transportation ==
=== Car ===
Groningen Airport Eelde is accessible by car using exit 37 of the Motorway A28.

=== Bicycle ===
Separated bicycle infrastructure exists almost the entire way from the City of Groningen to Groningen Airport Eelde using either the Groningerweg/Hoofdweg or the bicycle paths parallel to the A28/E232 motorway.

=== Public transport ===
The closest major railway stations are in Assen and Groningen.

Buses connect the airport with Groningen. A bus connection to Assen is possible with a change in De Punt.

- Line 9 is operated by Qbuzz and is a regular city bus that connects Groningen Noord railway station with the village of De Punt via the city centre, Groningen railway station, the town of Eelde and the airport. At De Punt bus station, line 9 connects with line 50 to Assen railway station. Lines 9 and 50 both operate half-hourly from Monday to Saturday during the morning and afternoon, and hourly on evenings and Sundays.
