= List of defunct airlines of the Netherlands =

This is a list of defunct airlines of the Netherlands.

Airline	Image	IATA	ICAO	Callsign	Founded	Ceased operations	Notes
Aero Charter International					1991	1993	Established as SAFE Holland in 1988
Aero Holland					1948	1953	
Aerotranscargo NL					2020	2021	Subsidiary of Aerotranscargo that never launched
Aero-Taxi					1961	1964	
Air Exel Commuter		XT	AXL	EXEL COMMUTER	1991	1998	Renamed KLM Exel
Air Exel Netherlands		XT	AXL	EXEL COMMUTER	2004	2005	
Air Holland		GG	AHD	AIR HOLLAND	1984	1991	
Air Holland		GG	HLN	ORANGE	1992	2004	
Air Transport Schiphol			ATQ	MULTI	1992	1993	Operated BAe Jetstream
Airsprinter					1977	1979	
Amsterdam Airlines		WD	AAN	AMSTEL	2007	2011	
Arke		OR	TFL	ARKE	2013	2015	Renamed TUI fly Netherlands
ArkeFly		OR	TFL	ARKEFLY	2005	2013	Renamed Arke
BAS Business Air Services					1974	1979	Operated Piper Navajo
BASE Business Airlines		5E	ATQ		1985	1994	Renamed BASE Regional Airlines
BASE Regional Airlines		5E	BRO	COASTRIDER	1994	2001	Operated BAe Jetstream, Embraer Brasilia, Beech 1900, Fokker 50
Basiq Air					2000	2005	Merged into Transavia
BikAir			BIK	BIKAIR	2008	2009	Operated Cessna Citation Mustang
Bright Air			BHT	BRIGHTAIR	1996	1998	Operated Swearingen Merlin IV
CityConnect		6N	TRQ		2003	2004	Established as Turdus Airways in 1984
Denim Air		G6	DNM	DENIM	1996	2016	AOC revoked
Duijvestijn Aviation					1999	2001	
Dutch Dakota Association					1982	2005	Renamed DDA Classic Airlines.
DutchBird		5D	DBR	DUTCHBIRD	2000	2004	
DutchCaribbeanExel			HXL		2004	2005	
Dynamic Airlines			DYE	DYNAMITE	1980	2006	
Euravia SAFE					1990	1991	Established as SAFE Holland in 1988. Renamed Aero Charter International
Fairlines		4X	FLS	FAIRLINE	1995	2000	Operated Embraer Bandeirante
Fairways Rotterdam		RM			1961	1964	Established as Transaero Rotterdam in 1961. Operated Douglas DC-3
Farnair Europe			FNE		1995	2000	Rebranded as Farnair Netherlands
Farnair Netherlands			FRN	FARNED	2000	2002	Rebranded as Magic Blue Airlines
Flexair		VV	FXY	FLEXY	1989	1994	Operated Dornier 228
FlyDenim		J7	DNM	DENIM	2015	2016	Operated Embraer ERJ 145 MP, Fokker 100
Holland Aero Leasing					1978	1988	Operated Piper Navajo, Piper Chieftain
Holland Aero Lines		DG			1977	1987	Operated ATR 42, GAF Nomad
HollandExel		YZ	HXL	HOLLAND EXEL	2003	2005	Rebranded as ArkeFly
Interstate Airlines		I4	FWA	FREEWAYAIR	2005	2009	Went bankrupt
Jet Link Holland			JLH		1991	2000	Went bankrupt following revoked AOC
KLM Aerocarto		KL			1954	1979	Operated Beech Queen Air, Piper Chieftain, Cessna Stationair
KLM Exel		KL			1998	2004	Renamed Air Exel Netherlands
KLM Helikopters		KL	AMS	KLM HELI	1965	1998	
Limburg Air Cargo					1975	1976	
Limburg Airlines		HF			1973	1973	Operated Fokker F27
Maastricht Airlines		W2			2013	2013	Never launched
Magic Bird			MGC		2006	2007	
Magic Blue Airlines			MJB	MAGICBLUE	2004	2005	Reincorporated as Magic Bird
Martin's Air Charter		MP	MAC		1958	1966	Renamed Martinair
Metropolis		DN	MPS	METRO REGIONAL	2001	2003	Operated Embraer Brasilia
Moormanair					1968	1971	Operated Douglas DC-3
NetherLines		WU	NET	NETHERLINES	1984	1991	Merged with NLM CityHopper to form KLM Cityhopper
NLM CityHopper		HN	NLM	CITY	1988	1991	Merged with NetherLines to form KLM Cityhopper
NLM Nederlandse Luchtvaart Maatschappij		HN	NLM		1966	1988	Domestic subsidiary of KLM. Renamed NLM CityHopper.
North Sea Airways			NRC	NORTH SEA	2004	2006	Operated Piper Navajo
NV National Vliegtuigbeheer					1970	1973	Operated Dornier Do 28
Orange Aircraft Leasing			RNG	ORANGE	2005	2011	Operated Beech 1900D
Quick Airways					1984	2006	Operated Piper Navajo
Quick Airways Holland			QAH	QUICK	?	2007	Operated Mitsubishi MU-2, Piper Navajo
Rijnmond Air Services			RAZ	RIJNMOND	1980s	1999	Operated Piper Navajo, Swearingen Merlin IV
Rossair Europe			ROS	CATCHER	2000	2004	
Rotterdam Airlines		RY	REL	ROMEO YANKEE	1977	1984	Operated Boeing 737-200, Fokker F28
Rotterdam Jet Center			JCR	ROTTERDAM JETCENTER	?	?	
SAFE Holland					1988	1990	Renamed Euravia SAFE
Schreiner Airways		AW	SCH	SCHREINER	1945	2005	Rebranded as CHC Airways
Sinberg					1961	1964	Operated SAN Jodel D.140 Mousquetaire
Solid Air			SOX	SOLIDAIR	1996	2011	Operated Bombardier CRJ-200, Cessna Citations, Dornier 328
Trans Travel Airlines		6N	TRQ	HUNTER	1996	2003	Rebranded as CityConnect. Operated ATR 42, Dash-8, Beech 1900D, Fokker 50
Transaero Rotterdam					1961	1961	Renamed Fairways Rotterdam. Operated Douglas DC-3
Transavia Holland		HV			1967	1986	Renamed Transavia
Transavia Limburg					1966	1967	Renamed Transavia Holland
Tulip Air		TD	TLP	TULIPAIR	1997	2006	Merged into Farnair Europe. Operated Airbus A300, Beech King Air, Beech 400, BAe Jetstream 31, Piper Navajo
Tulip Air Charter					1997	2002	Cargo division of Tulip Air
Turdus Airways			TRK		1984	1996	Renamed Trans Travel Airlines. Operated Piper Cherokee, Cessna Skylane
Twente Airlines					1990	1991	
V Bird		VX	VBA	VEEBEE	2003	2005	Went bankrupt
Veen's Air Service					1961	1962	Acquired by Martin's Air Charter
XP Airlines		OH	XPS	XP PARCEL	1986	1989	Division of KLM

== See also ==
- List of airlines of Netherlands
- List of defunct airlines of the Netherlands Antilles
- List of airports in Netherlands
