= HXL =

HXL may refer to:

- Hexcel (stock ticker: HXL), an American materials company
- BelgiumExel (ICAO code: HXL), a defunct Belgian airline
- HollandExel (ICAO code: HXL), a defunct Dutch airline
- DutchCaribbeanExel (ICAO code: HXL), a defunct Dutch airline
- Guangzhou–Shenzhen–Hong Kong Express Rail Link (HXL)
- Laarwald Grenze train station (station code: HXL), a Deutsche Bahn station

== See also ==
- HX1 (disambiguation)
