= List of airlines of the Netherlands =

This is a list of airlines currently operating in the Netherlands.

== Scheduled airlines ==
Airline	Image	IATA	ICAO	Callsign	Commenced operations	Notes
AIS Airlines		-	PNX	SPINNER	2009	
Corendon Dutch Airlines		CD	CND	DUTCH CORENDON	2010	
KLM		KL	KLM	KLM	1919	Flag carrier. World's oldest operating airline
KLM Cityhopper		WA	KLC	CITY	1991	
Transavia		HV	TRA	TRANSAVIA	1966	
TUI Airlines Netherlands		OR	TFL	ORANGE	2005	

== Charter airlines ==
Airline	Image	IATA	ICAO	Callsign	Commenced operations	Notes
CHC Airways		AW	SCH	SCHREINER	1945	
Dutch Dakota Association					1983	
Heli Holland			HHE	HELI HOLLAND	1976	

== Cargo airlines ==
Airline	Image	IATA	ICAO	Callsign	Commenced operations	Notes
Martinair		MP	MPH	MARTINAIR	1958	

== See also ==
- List of defunct airlines of Netherlands
- List of defunct airlines of Europe
- List of airlines
