= DutchCaribbeanExel =

Airline of the Netherlands (2004–2005)

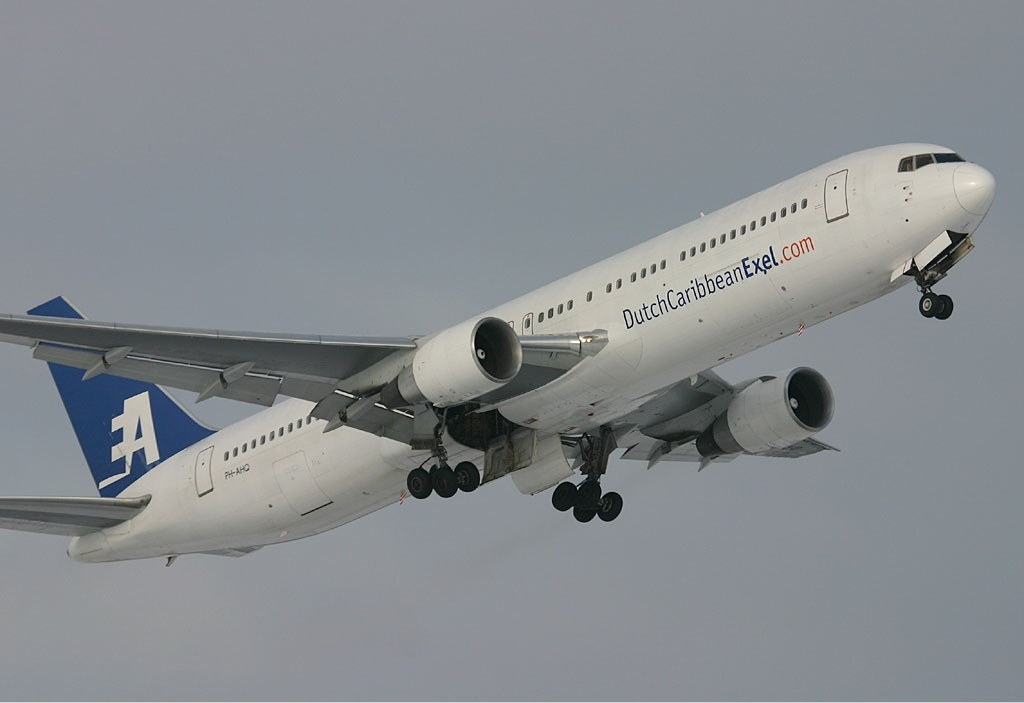
- Boeing 767-300ER
- Founded: 2004
- Commenced operations: 15 July 2004
- Ceased operations: 31 January 2005
- Hubs: Amsterdam Airport Schiphol
- Focus cities: Curaçao International Airport
- Fleet size: 1
- Destinations: 4
- Parent company: ExelAviation Group
- Headquarters: Amsterdam, Netherlands
- Website: www.dutchcaribbeanexel.com

DutchCaribbeanExel was an airline with its head office in Amsterdam. The airline connected from the Netherlands to the Netherlands Antilles and was based at Amsterdam Airport Schiphol.

== History ==
The airline was established in 2004 and started operations on 15 July 2004. It was wholly owned by ExelAviation Group. The airline folded in early February 2005 when the group declared bankruptcy.

The ExelAviation Group started to disintegrate in late 2004, soon after the takeover of DutchBird; when failed Air Holland (declared bankrupt with €30M in debt) was investigated for alleged laundering of drug money and arrests were made, it put HollandExel in negative publicity as well.

In February 2005, HollandExel filed for the Dutch equivalent of Chapter 11 and its main client, tour operator TUI Netherlands invested millions to keep the airline flying. Two months later, TUI Netherlands continued HollandExel under new management, operating as ArkeFly and the fleet of aircraft plus some 400 employees moved to the new company.

DutchCaribbeanExel would later, together with its sister airline, HollandExel, be taken over by TUI AG and renamed Arkefly Curaçao.

== Destinations ==
When it ceased operations in January 2005, DutchCaribbeanExel operated the following services:

Country	City	Airport	Notes
Aruba	Oranjestad	Queen Beatrix International Airport	Charter
Bonaire	Kralendijk	Flamingo International Airport	Charter
Curaçao	Willemstad	Curaçao International Airport	Focus city
Netherlands	Amsterdam	Amsterdam Airport Schiphol	Hub

== Fleet ==
The DutchCaribbeanExel fleet consisted of the following aircraft (at April 2005):

DutchCaribbeanExel fleet
Aircraft	In service	Orders	Passengers			Notes
Aircraft	In service	Orders	C	Y	Total	Notes
Boeing 767-300ER	1	—	12	248	260	Operated by HollandExel
Total	1	—				

== See also ==
- HollandExel
- List of defunct airlines of the Netherlands
