= Interstate Airlines =

Dutch charter airline

IATA	ICAO	Call sign
I4	FWA	FREEWAYAIR
- Founded: 2005
- Ceased operations: 2009
- Fleet size: 16
- Headquarters: Maastricht
- Key people: Roberto Stinga
- Website: http://www.interstateairlines.com/

Interstate Airlines was a charter airline based in Maastricht, Netherlands. It operated wet lease services within Europe. Its main base was Maastricht Aachen Airport.

== History ==
The airline based the Netherlands was founded by Nico Hemmer and Roberto Stinga - former founder and CEO of Air Exel and V Bird - and started operations in July 2005. It has 25 employees (at March 2007). It went bankrupt in 2010.

== Scheduled destinations ==
- Germany
  - Düsseldorf - Düsseldorf Airport
- Morocco
  - Nador - Nador International Airport
- Netherlands
  - Amsterdam - Amsterdam Schiphol Airport

== Fleet ==
The Interstate Airlines fleet consisted of the following aircraft (as of 8 January 2009)

- 16 ATR 42-500
