= HX1 =

HX1 or variation, may refer to:

- HX1 post code in the UK HX postcode area
- HX1, the first of the HX convoys
- Tianwen-1 (formerly: Huoxing-1, HX-1), the first Chinese space probe to reach Mars
- Helowerks HX-1 Wasp, an ultralight helicopter
- Pentecost HX-1 Hoppi-Copter, a backpack helicopter (a personal "jet pack")
- HX1 series of RMMV HX range of tactical trucks
- Hexiang HX-1, a Chinese UAV drone

== See also ==
- Sony CyberShot DSC-HX1 HyperXoom digital camera
- HXL (disambiguation)

- HX (disambiguation)
- H1 (disambiguation)
- X1 (disambiguation)
- H (disambiguation)
- X (disambiguation)
- 1 (disambiguation)
