= John Nicolaas Block =

Dutch aviation pioneer

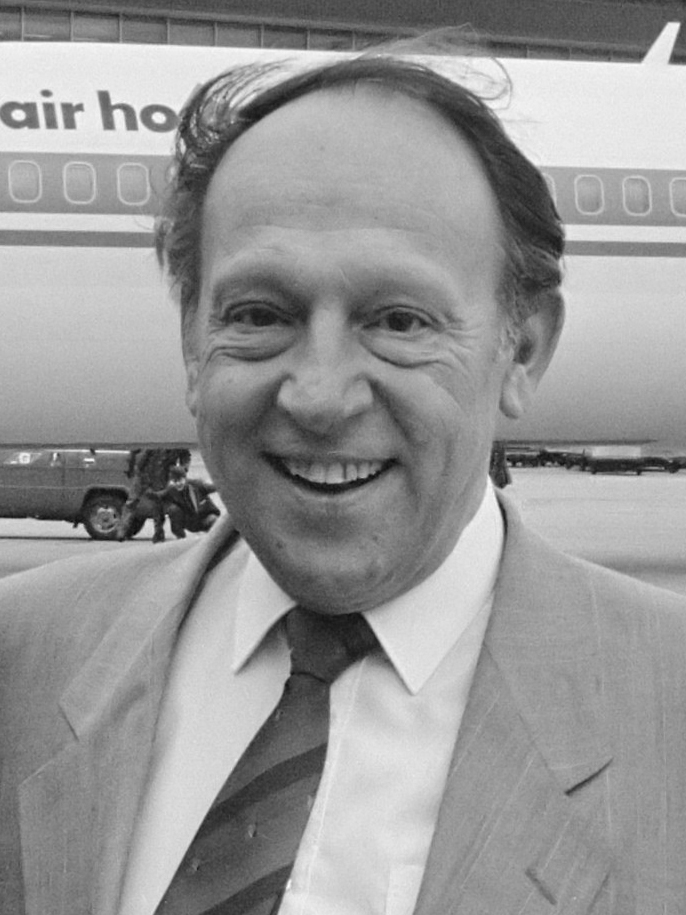
John Block (1985)

Johan Nicolaas Block (May 18, 1929, Amsterdam – April 11, 1994) was a Dutch aviation pioneer. He was the co-founder of Martinair, founder of Transavia and Air Holland.

== Early life ==
John Block was born as the son of a schoolteacher in Amsterdam. After World War II he applied for a job with KLM but wasn't hired. He joined the Dutch airforce and became an airforce pilot. After his service he briefly worked with a radio division of the Dutch postal services and obtained his commercial aviation licence.

== Airline founder ==
Together with Martin Schröder he founded Martin's Air Charter, which was renamed Martinair 8 years later. They introduced leisure travel by plane in the Netherlands. Block left Martinair in 1965.

In 1966, Block bought the 'sleeping' airline Transavia Limburg and refounded it as Transavia. It was originally established as an air charter operator. Block built up the airline from scratch and ten years later Transavia had a marketshare of 45% of the Dutch holiday market. After a quarrel with some investors Block left Transavia in 1975.

He went on and founded the small company Jetstar Holland BV in 1977. As such he introduced the use of executive jet travel in the Netherlands. He sold the company soon after to an investment holding and went back to the larger scheme.

In 1984, Block founded the airline Air Holland that went public in 1989. Block left Air Holland in 1991 following a fall in profits.

Block died in 1994.
