= Oude Meer =

- Hamlet
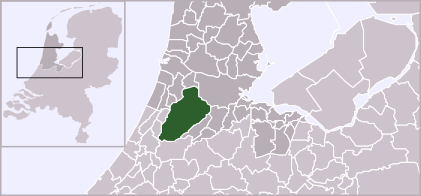

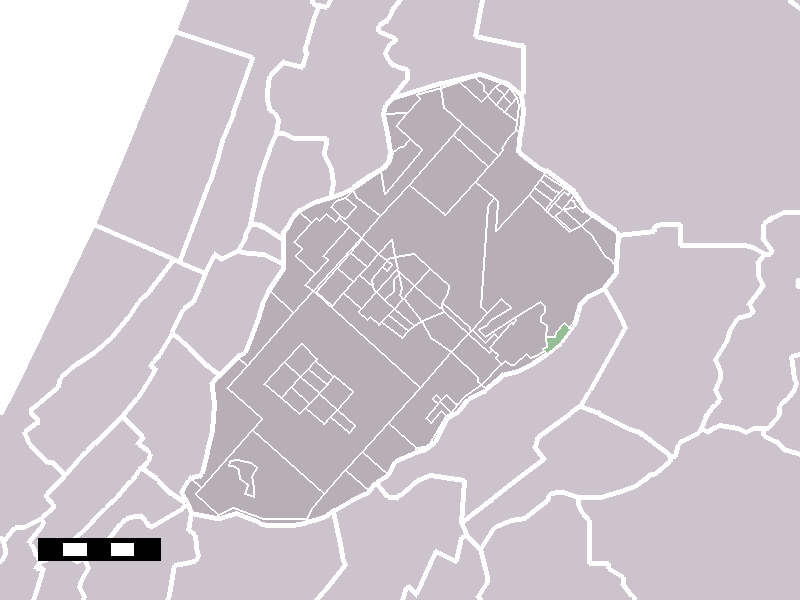
- Oude Meer in the municipality of Haarlemmermeer.
- Coordinates: 52°17′N 4°47′E
- Country: Netherlands
- Province: North Holland
- Municipality: Haarlemmermeer

Population
  - Total: 230
- Time zone: UTC+1 (CET)
  - Summer (DST): UTC+2 (CEST)

Oude Meer is a hamlet in the Dutch province of North Holland. It is a part of the municipality of Haarlemmermeer, and lies about 7 km east of Hoofddorp.

Oude Meer has a population of around 230.

Before its disestablishment, Air Holland's head office was in Oude Meer. Several large firms benefit from the close proximity to Schiphol Airport, including FedEx and Ushio Europe B.V., which chose Oude Meer as the location for its headquarters by occupying offices at Sky Park. The adjoining Fokker Logistics Park houses several hubs for logistical companies such as DSV
