= Air Cargo Germany =

German cargo airline

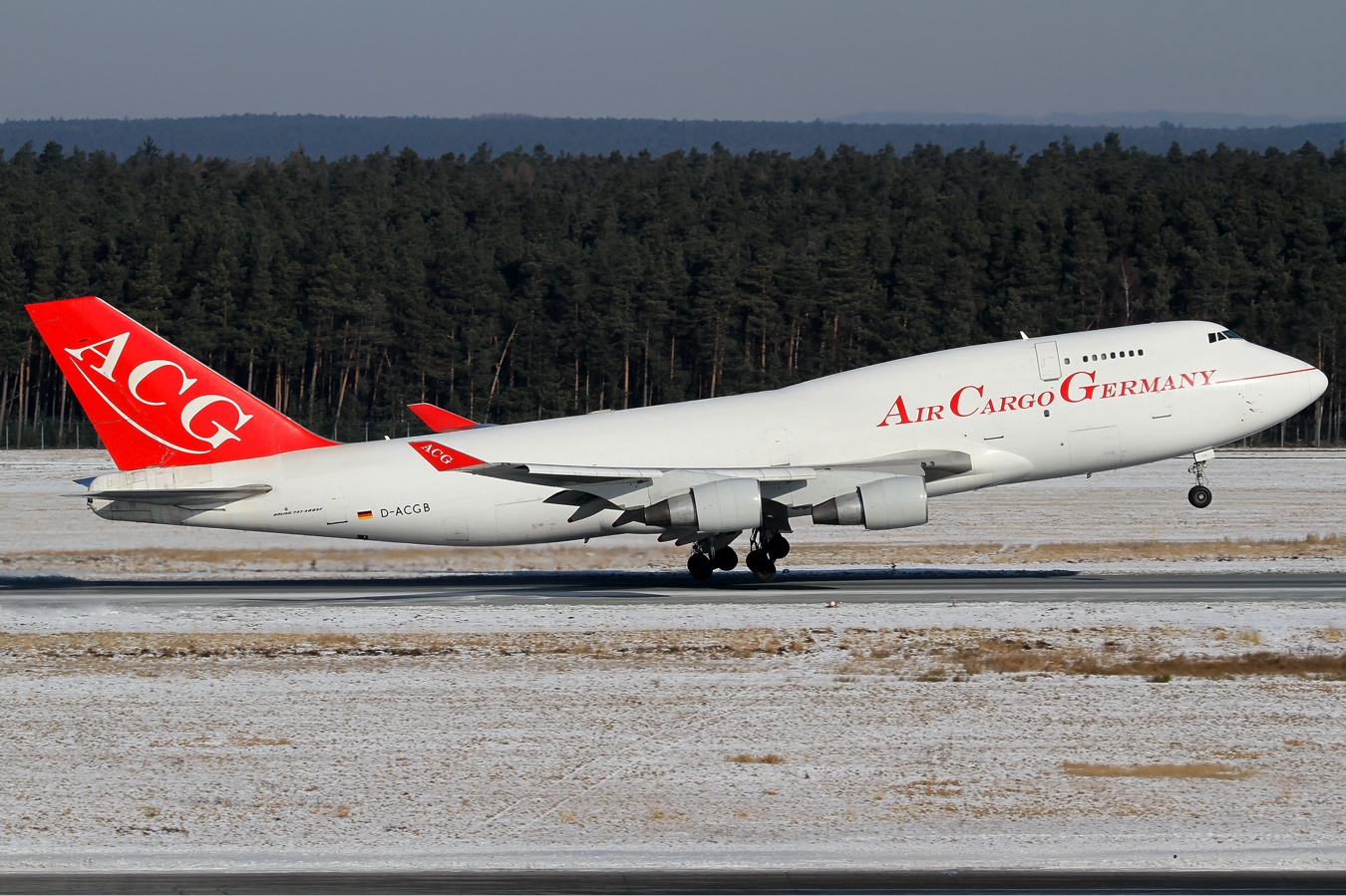
- Boeing 747-400 freighter departing Nuremberg Airport in 2012
| IATA | ICAO | Call sign |
|---|---|---|
| 6U | ACX | LOADMASTER |
- Founded: June 2008
- Commenced operations: July 24, 2009
- Ceased operations: April 18, 2013
- Operating bases: Frankfurt-Hahn Airport
- Fleet size: 4 (at closure)
- Headquarters: Frankfurt-Hahn Airport
- Key people: Michael Schaecher (CEO); Thomas Homering (managing director)
- Website: www.acg.aero

Air Cargo Germany GmbH (abbreviated ACG) was a German cargo airline. Based at Frankfurt-Hahn Airport, it was operational between 2009 and 2013.

== History ==
In an attempt to challenge the pre-eminence of Lufthansa Cargo on the German air freight market, Air Cargo Germany was founded in 2008 by former LTU executives Michael Bock and Thomas Homering. The company with its headquarters at Frankfurt–Hahn Airport had its airline licence issued on 14 July 2009.

From the beginning, ACG had strong ties to Russian entrepreneurs, as much of the initial funding was provided by Rashid Mursekaev, a co-founder of VIM Airlines, and the business administration comprised a number of former Aeroflot-Cargo managers. Later, a co-operation with Volga-Dnepr Airlines and its subsidiary AirBridgeCargo Airlines was set up, which saw Volga-Dnepr acquiring a 49 percent stake in Air Cargo Germany in April 2012, the maximum allowed under EU rules for foreign ownership. To offer a joint network of some kind, ACG moved a number of its flights to Frankfurt Airport, which was already served by AirBridgeCargo, and began to focus its operations on Moscow-Sheremetyevo Airport.

According to EU regulations, airlines are required to provide evidence that they have sufficient financial resources for the next 12-month period. As Air Cargo Germany failed to do so at a Luftfahrt-Bundesamt (the German civil aviation authority) audit, it had its operating permit withdrawn and suspended all flight operations on 18 April 2013. Subsequently, on 3 May, insolvency was declared. In 2009, Air Cargo Germany had been granted loans by the German state of Rhineland-Palatinate and the operating company of Frankfurt-Hahn Airport (of which 82.5 percent are owned by Rhineland-Palatinate, too), accumulating to a total of €10 million. With ACG going bankrupt, this taxpayers' money is considered a default.

Plans for a relaunch did not materialize. As the legal maximum of ACG's shares (49 percent) were already owned by Russian (that is, non-EU) companies, the only possibility to acquire the needed equity funding would have been to find an investor from an EU member state. According to analysts, the initial suspension of its operations had led to Air Cargo Germany losing most of its freight transport contracts, which was further hampering any efforts to regain the necessary market trust. On 4 September 2013, it was reported that all 120 employees had been dismissed, bringing an end to the history of Air Cargo Germany.

== Destinations ==
In August 2012, Air Cargo Germany operated scheduled flights to the following destinations:

| City | Country | Airport |
|---|---|---|
| Yerevan | Armenia | Zvartnots International Airport |
| Shanghai | China | Shanghai Pudong International Airport |
| Frankfurt | Germany | Frankfurt Airport; Frankfurt-Hahn Airport (base) |
| Hanover | Germany | Hannover Airport |
| Almaty | Kazakhstan | Almaty International Airport |
| Nairobi | Kenya | Jomo Kenyatta International Airport |
| Mexico City | Mexico | Mexico City International Airport |
| Moscow | Russia | Sheremetyevo International Airport |
| Johannesburg | South Africa | OR Tambo International Airport |
| Atlanta | United States | Hartsfield-Jackson Atlanta International Airport |
| Chicago | United States | O'Hare International Airport |
| Dallas | United States | Dallas/Fort Worth International Airport |

== Fleet ==
Air Cargo Germany operated four cargo configured Boeing 747-400 aircraft. Of these, two were owned by Aircastle and were subleased to ACG by Martinair, and two were leased by Avion Aircraft Trading.
