= TUI fly Netherlands =

Charter airline of the Netherlands

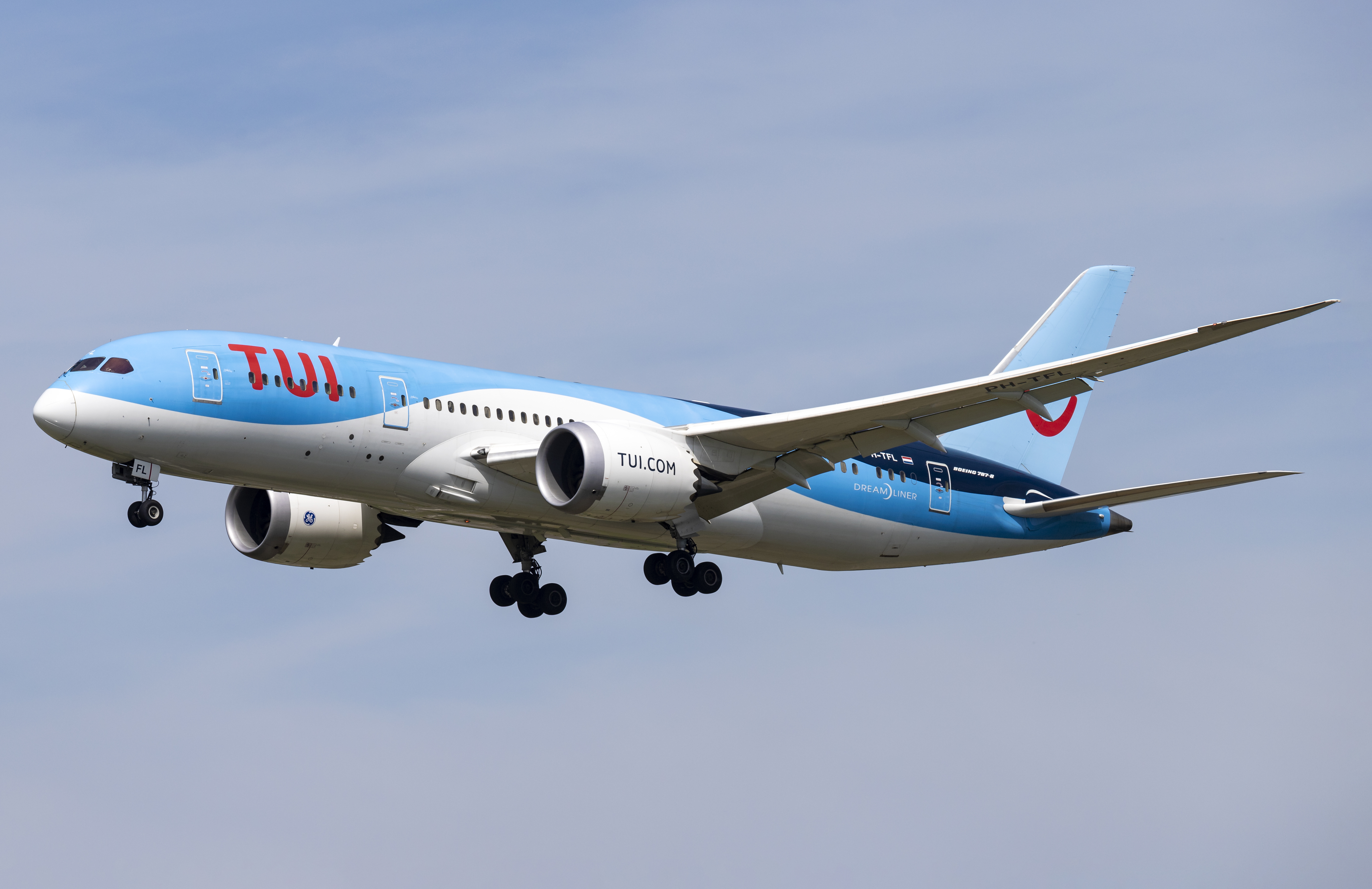
- TUI fly Netherlands Boeing 787-8
| IATA | ICAO | Call sign |
|---|---|---|
| OR | TFL | ORANGE |
- Founded: February 2005; 21 years ago (as Arkefly)
- Commenced operations: 21 April 2005; 21 years ago
- Operating bases: Amsterdam; Eindhoven; Rotterdam/The Hague
- Fleet size: 10
- Destinations: 60
- Parent company: TUI Group
- Headquarters: Haarlemmermeer, Netherlands
- Website: www.tui.nl

TUI fly Netherlands, legally incorporated as TUI Airlines Netherlands (formerly branded as Arkefly and Arke), is a Dutch charter airline headquartered in Schiphol-Rijk on the grounds of Amsterdam Airport Schiphol in Haarlemmermeer, Netherlands. It is the charter carrier of the Dutch arm of the German travel conglomerate TUI Group. Its main base is Schiphol Airport.

== History ==
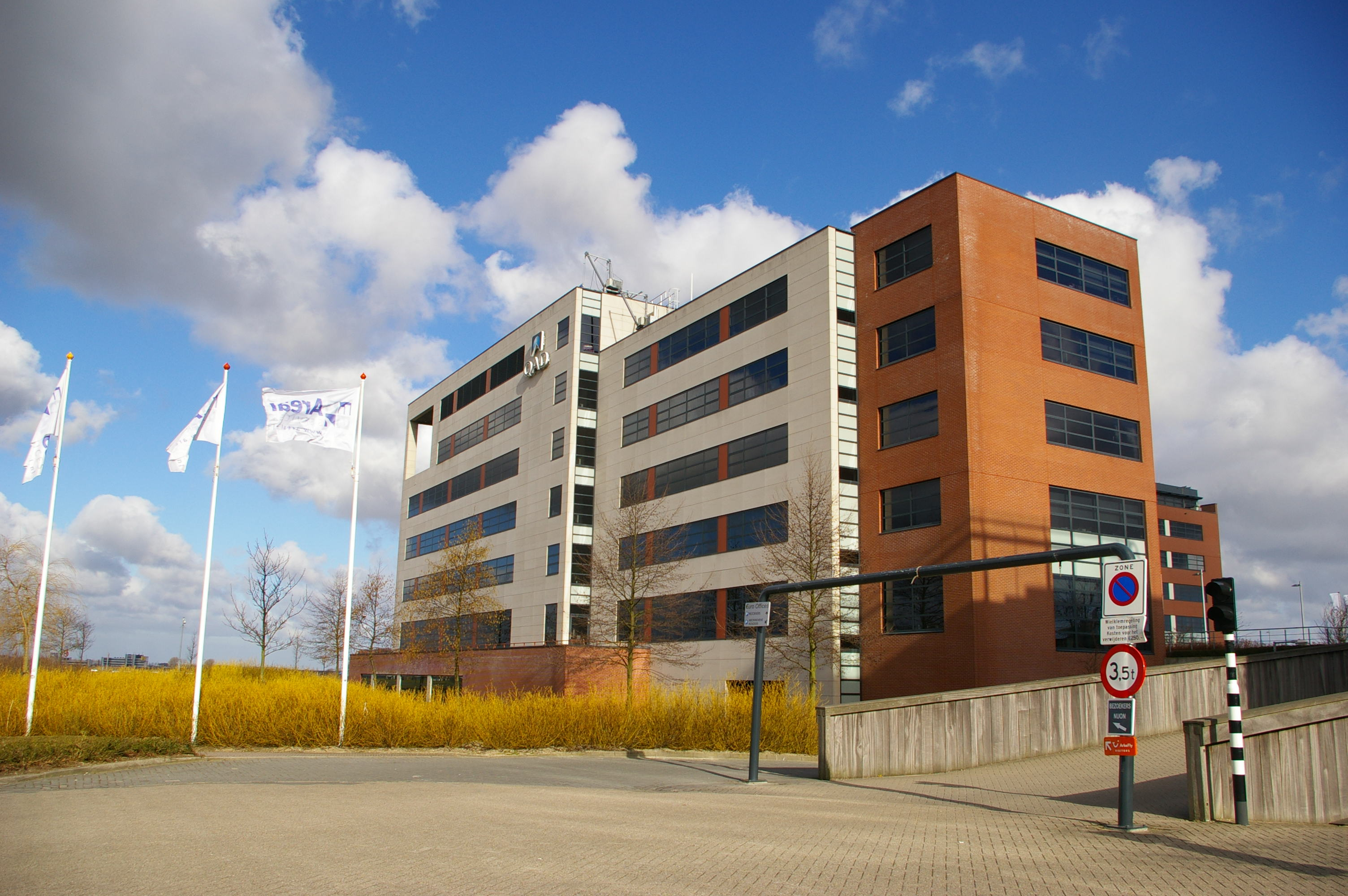
TUI fly Netherlands head office

=== Arkefly ===
TUI fly Netherlands traces its roots to Air Holland which was founded in 1981. After financial problems, Air Holland was taken over by the ExelAviation Group and took a new start as HollandExel in January 2004. In May 2005, the ExelAviation Group was declared bankrupt. The German TUI Group took over the airline's activities and renamed it ArkeFly.

Operations in Curaçao began on 15 July 2004 as DutchCaribbeanExel, which was also part of the ExelAviation Group but was later taken over, together with sister airline HollandExel, by the TUI Group and renamed ArkeFly Curaçao. ArkeFly started weekly flights to St. Maarten from Amsterdam on 2 December 2007, but discontinued this service in November 2008. TUI holds that flights may resume if the volume of tourists travelling to St. Maarten increases. Operations to Orlando, Miami, Puerto Vallarta, and Israel began in 2011.

In October 2013, Arkefly changed its marketing name to Arke to reflect the partnership with the travel agency of the same name.

=== TUI fly Netherlands ===
On 13 May 2015, it was announced by the TUI Group that all five of TUI's airline subsidiaries will be named TUI, whilst keeping their separate air operator's certificate, taking over three years to complete. Arke was the first to undergo the change and was renamed TUI on 1 October 2015, therefore also changing the airline's name.

TUI Group has 70 737 MAX aircraft on order for the group, the order consists of a mix of the 737 MAX 8 and MAX 10 models and some of these will be used for the airline to modernize the fleet and replace older aircraft. The number of aircraft allocated to TUI fly Netherlands is yet unknown with deliveries of the new aircraft commencing in January 2018. In November 2024, TUI fly Netherlands retired their last Boeing 767-300ER as the last TUI Group operator of this type.

== Destinations ==
TUI fly Netherlands carries out scheduled and chartered flights, although most of the chartered flights are operated for the Dutch tour operator TUI Netherlands. It operates to destinations in the Mediterranean, Finland, Canary Islands, Red Sea, Mexico, Caribbean, United States, Africa, Middle East and the Dutch Caribbean. Following is a list of destinations the airline flies and excludes its other destinations from airlines TUI fly Belgium, TUI fly Deutschland, TUI fly Nordic and TUI Airways.

As of September 2023, TUI fly Netherlands serves the following destinations:

| Country | City | Airport | Notes | Refs |
|---|---|---|---|---|
| Aruba | Aruba | Queen Beatrix International Airport | | |
| Albania | Tirana | Tirana International Airport | Seasonal | |
| Bonaire | Bonaire | Flamingo International Airport | | |
| Bulgaria | Burgas | Burgas Airport | Seasonal charter | |
| Cape Verde | Boa Vista | Aristides Pereira International Airport | | |
| Cape Verde | Sal | Amílcar Cabral International Airport | | |
| Cape Verde | São Vicente | Cesária Évora Airport | | |
| Curaçao | Curaçao | Curaçao International Airport | | |
| Dominican Republic | Punta Cana | Punta Cana International Airport | | |
| Egypt | Hurghada | Hurghada International Airport | | |
| Egypt | Marsa Alam | Marsa Alam International Airport | Seasonal charter | |
| Egypt | Sharm El Sheikh | Sharm El Sheikh International Airport | Seasonal charter | |
| Finland | Ivalo | Ivalo Airport | Seasonal charter | |
| Finland | Kajaani | Kajaani Airport | Seasonal | |
| Finland | Kittilä | Kittilä Airport | Seasonal charter | |
| Finland | Kuusamo | Kuusamo Airport | Seasonal charter | |
| Gambia | Banjul | Banjul International Airport | | |
| Greece | Chania | Chania International Airport | Seasonal charter | |
| Greece | Corfu | Corfu International Airport | Seasonal charter | |
| Greece | Heraklion | Heraklion International Airport | Seasonal charter | |
| Greece | Karpathos | Karpathos Island National Airport | Seasonal charter | |
| Greece | Kavala | Kavala International Airport | Seasonal charter | |
| Greece | Kefalonia | Kefalonia International Airport | Seasonal charter | |
| Greece | Kos | Kos International Airport | Seasonal charter | |
| Greece | Preveza | Aktion National Airport | Seasonal charter | |
| Greece | Rhodes | Rhodes International Airport | Seasonal charter | |
| Greece | Samos | Samos International Airport | Seasonal charter | |
| Greece | Skiathos | Skiathos International Airport | Seasonal charter | |
| Greece | Zakynthos | Zakynthos International Airport | Seasonal charter | |
| Jamaica | Montego Bay | Sangster International Airport | | |
| Mauritius | Plaine Magnien | Sir Seewoosagur Ramgoolam International Airport | Seasonal charter | |
| Morocco | Marrakesh | Marrakesh Menara Airport | | |
| Morocco | Nador | Nador International Airport | | |
| Morocco | Oujda | Angads Airport | Seasonal charter | |
| Mexico | Cancún | Cancún International Airport | | |
| Netherlands | Amsterdam | Amsterdam Airport Schiphol | Hub | |
| Netherlands | Eindhoven | Eindhoven Airport | Base | |
| Netherlands | Rotterdam | Rotterdam Airport | Base | |
| Netherlands | Groningen | Groningen Airport Eelde | | |
| North Macedonia | Ohrid | Ohrid St. Paul the Apostle Airport | Seasonal charter | |
| Portugal | Funchal | Madeira Airport | Seasonal charter | |
| Portugal | Ponta Delgada | João Paulo II Airport | Seasonal charter | |
| Portugal | Terceira | Lajes Airport | Seasonal charter | |
| Senegal | Dakar | Blaise Diagne International Airport | Seasonal charter | |
| Spain | Fuerteventura | Fuerteventura Airport | | |
| Spain | Ibiza | Ibiza Airport | Seasonal charter | |
| Spain | La Palma | La Palma Airport | Seasonal charter | |
| Spain | Lanzarote | Lanzarote Airport | | |
| Spain | Las Palmas | Gran Canaria Airport | | |
| Spain | Palma de Mallorca | Palma de Mallorca Airport | Seasonal charter | |
| Spain | Tenerife | Tenerife South Airport | | |
| Spain | Reus | Reus Airport | Seasonal | |
| Sweden | Sälen Trysil | Scandinavian Mountains Airport | | |
| Tunisia | Djerba | Djerba–Zarzis International Airport | Seasonal charter | |
| Tunisia | Enfidha | Enfidha–Hammamet International Airport | Seasonal charter | |
| Turkey | Antalya | Antalya Airport | Seasonal charter | |
| Turkey | Bodrum | Milas–Bodrum Airport | Seasonal charter | |
| Turkey | Dalaman | Dalaman Airport | Seasonal charter | |
| Turkey | Gazipasa | Gazipasa Airport | Seasonal | |
| Turkey | İzmir | İzmir Adnan Menderes Airport | Seasonal charter | |

=== Codeshare agreements ===
Additionally, TUI fly Netherlands used to have a codeshare agreement with Surinam Airways.

== Fleet ==
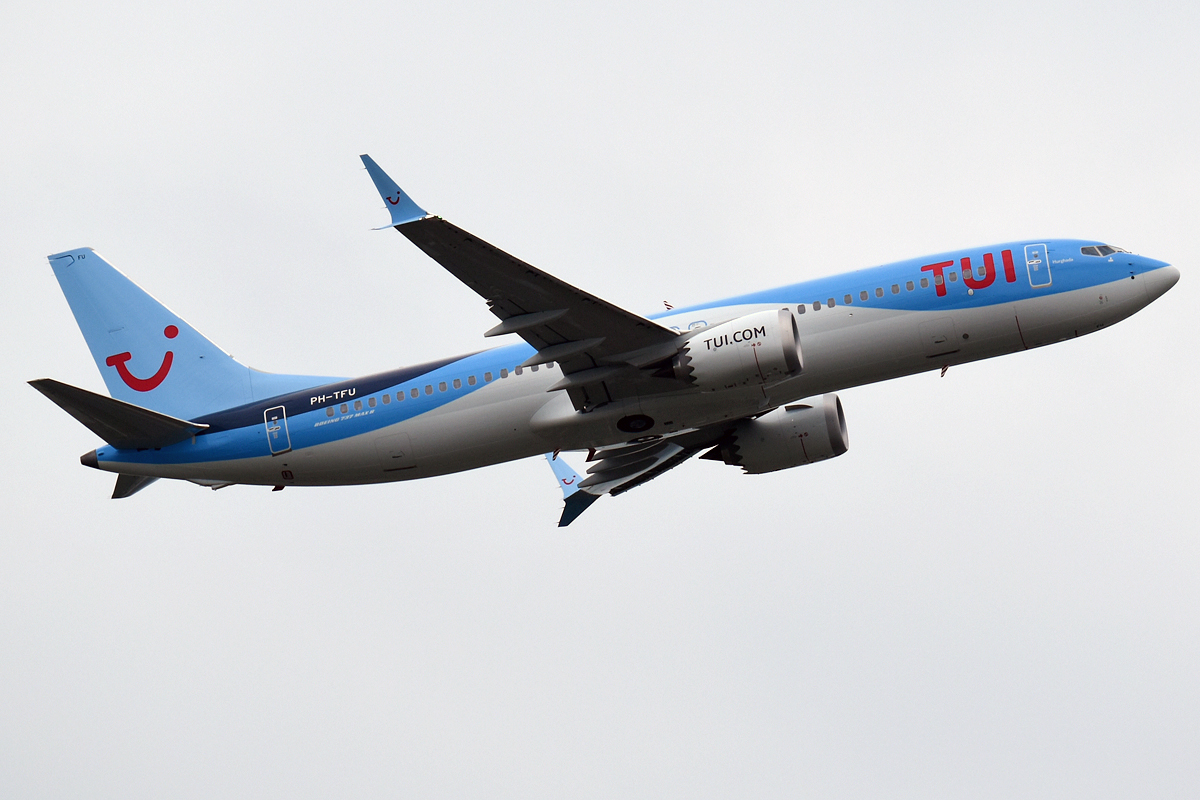
TUI fly Netherlands Boeing 737 MAX 8

=== Current fleet ===
As of August 2025, TUI fly Netherlands operates the following aircraft:

TUI fly Netherlands fleet
| Aircraft | In service | Orders | Passengers | | | Notes |
| Aircraft | In service | Orders | W | Y | Total | Notes |
|---|---|---|---|---|---|---|
| Boeing 737 MAX 8 | 6 | — | — | 189 | 189 | To be phased out in 2027 and replaced by Boeing 737 MAX 10. |
| Boeing 737 MAX 10 | — | 7 | TBA | | | Deliveries in 2027 and replacing Boeing 737 MAX 8. |
| Boeing 787-8 | 4 | — | 25 | 280 | 305 | |
| Total | 10 | 7 | | | | |

=== Former fleet ===
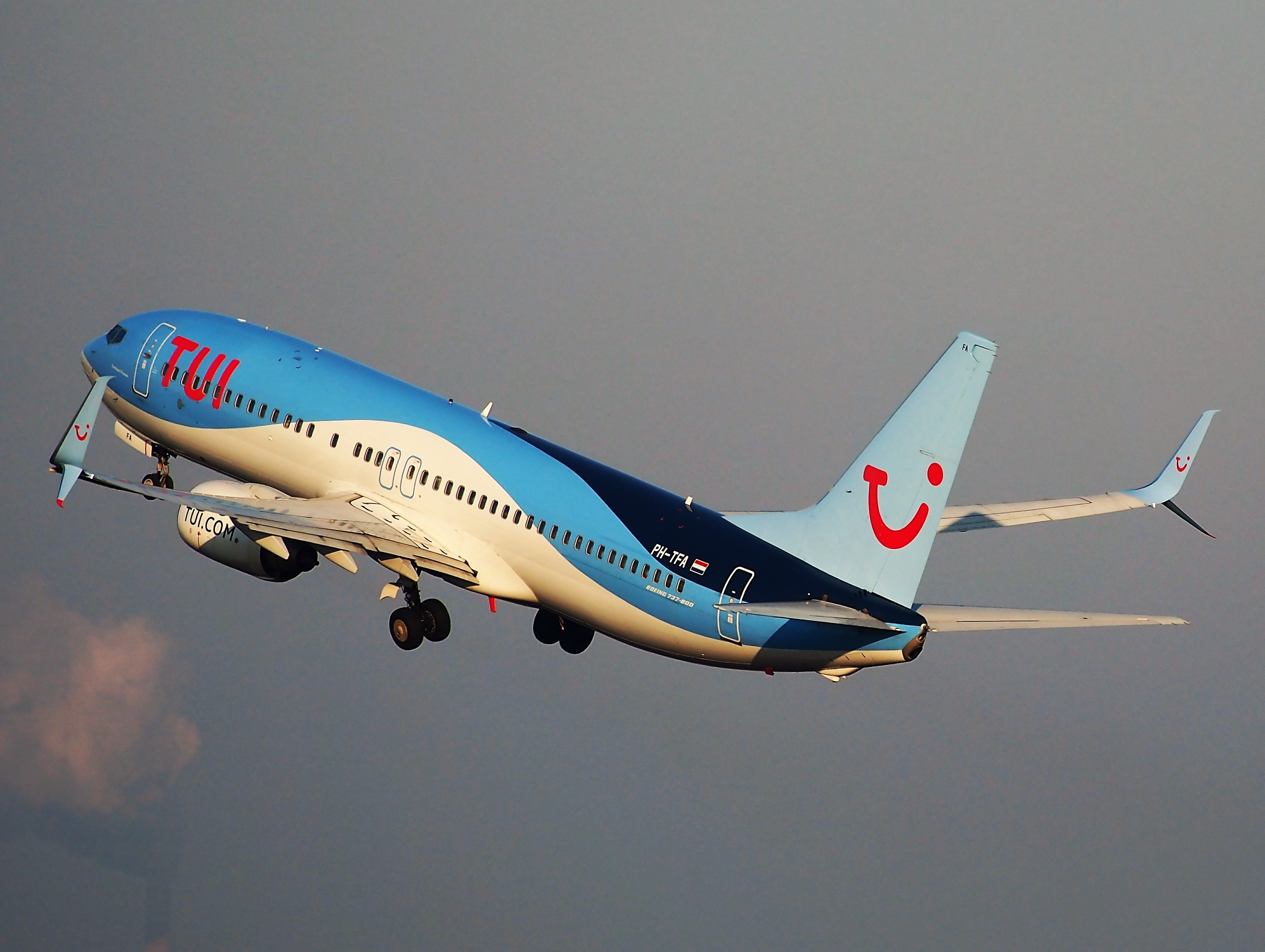
A former TUI fly Netherlands Boeing 737-800 (2016)

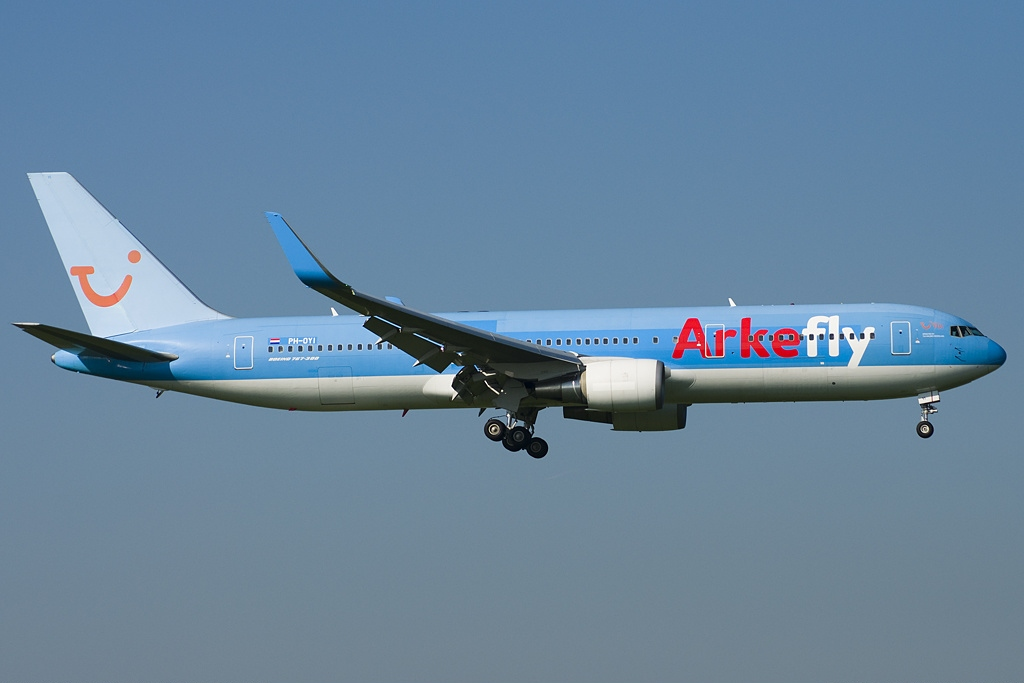
A former ArkeFly Boeing 767-300ER (2010)

TUI fly Netherlands formerly operated the following aircraft:

TUI fly Netherlands former fleet
| Aircraft | Total | Introduced | Retired | Notes |
|---|---|---|---|---|
| Airbus A320-200 | 7 | 2019 | 2022 | Leased for the Summer seasons. |
| Airbus A321-200 | 1 | 2006 | 2006 | Leased from British Midland International. |
| Boeing 737-300 | 1 | 2013 | 2013 | Leased from AirExplore. |
| Boeing 737-300 | 1 | 2015 | 2015 | Leased from Jet Time. |
| Boeing 737-400 | 2 | 2013 | 2013 | Leased from AirExplore. |
| Boeing 737-800 | 21 | 2005 | 2021 | |
| Boeing 737-800 | 2 | 2022 | 2022 | Leased from Sunwing Airlines. |
| Boeing 737-900ER | 2 | 2008 | 2008 | Leased from Futura International Airways. |
| Boeing 757-200 | 1 | 2009 | 2009 | Leased from Skyservice Airlines. |
| Boeing 767-300ER | 7 | 2000 | 2024 | |

== See also ==
- List of airlines of the Netherlands
