= V Bird =

Dutch airline

IATA	ICAO	Call sign
VX	VBA	VEEBEE
- Founded: 2003
- Commenced operations: 27 October 2003
- Ceased operations: January 2005
- Hubs: Weeze Airport
- Frequent-flyer program: V Club
- Fleet size: 4
- Destinations: 19
- Headquarters: Maastricht Aachen Airport, Beek, Netherlands
- Website: www.vbird.com

V Bird (legally V Bird Airlines Netherlands BV) was a low-cost airline based in the Netherlands which operated services to northern and southern Europe. Its head office was on the grounds of Maastricht Aachen Airport in Beek, Netherlands.

== History ==
The airline was established in 2003 and started operations on 27 October 2003. The airline suspended operations on 8 October 2004 and subsequently filed for bankruptcy on 18 October 2004. V Bird received an offer from an unnamed potential backer three days later with a view to restarting operations, but the airline was liquidated in early January 2005.

== Fleet ==
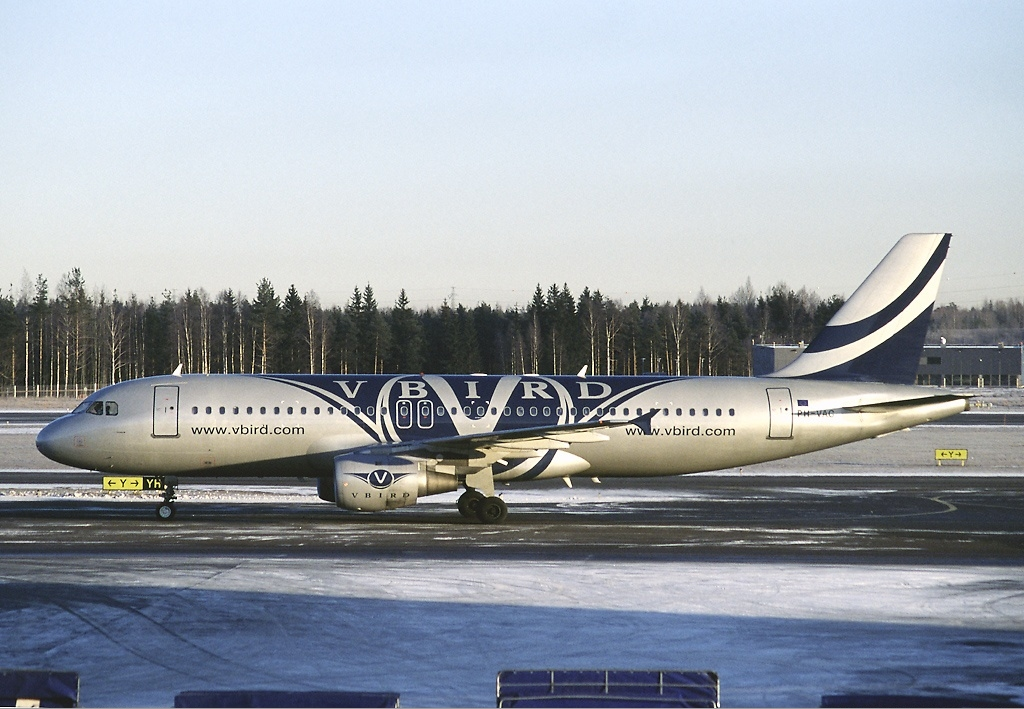
A V Bird Airbus A320-200 at Helsinki Airport in 2004

The V Bird fleet consisted of the following aircraft:

V Birdfleet
Aircraft	Total	Introduced	Retired	Notes
Airbus A320-200	4	2003	2004	3 leased from ILFC; 1 leased from Dutchbird

== See also ==
- List of defunct airlines of the Netherlands
