= BelgiumExel =

Airline of Belgium (2004–2005)

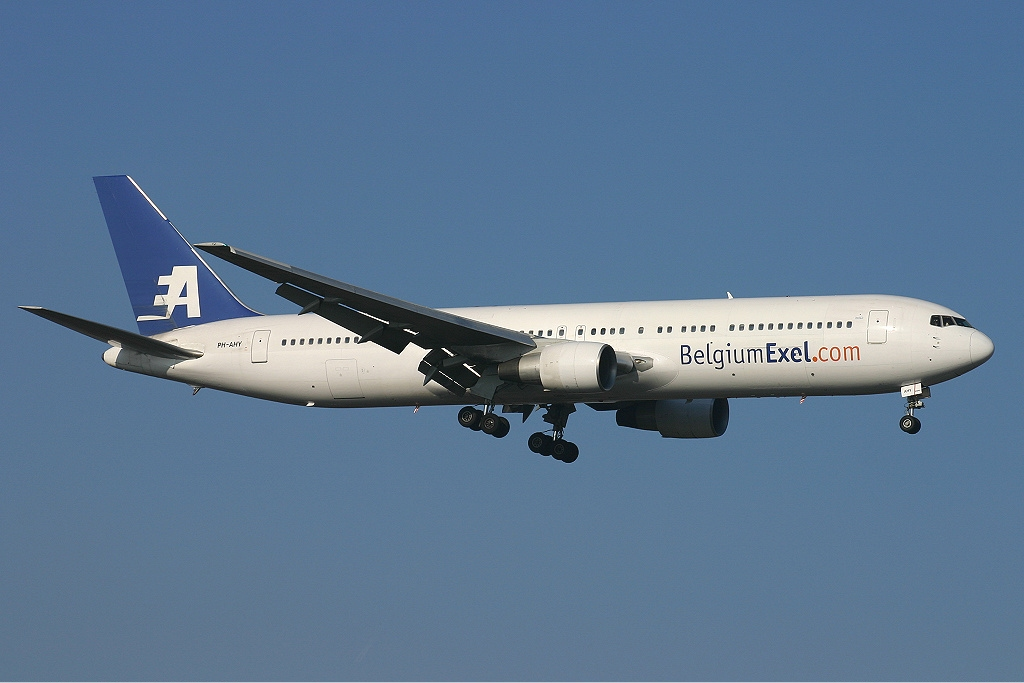
- Boeing 767-300ER
- Commenced operations: 15 February 2004
- Ceased operations: 31 January 2005
- Operating bases: Brussels Airport
- Fleet size: 1
- Parent company: ExelAviation Group
- Headquarters: Brussels, Belgium
- Website: www.belgiumexel.com

BelgiumExel was a Belgian airline owned by ExelAviation Group. It operated charter flights to Africa, Asia, and the Caribbean as part of holiday packages for Thomas Cook AG, and it functioned as the sister airline of HollandExel. The airline started operations on 15 February 2004 to cover the gap left by the closure of Sobelair. However, services ceased on 31 January 2005 after the tour operator terminated its contract due to financial difficulties, and in May 2005, ExelAviation Group subsequently declared bankruptcy.

== Fleet ==
The BelgiumExel fleet consisted of the following aircraft:

Aircraft	In service	Passengers			Notes
Aircraft	In service	C	Y	Total	Notes
Boeing 767-300ER	1	12	260	272	Leased from Scandinavian Airlines.
Total	1				

== See also ==
- List of defunct airlines of Belgium
