= Magic Blue Airlines =

Dutch charter airline

IATA	ICAO	Call sign
–	MJB	Magic Blue
- Founded: January 2004
- Ceased operations: 2005
- Operating bases: Amsterdam Schiphol Airport
- Fleet size: See Fleet below
- Headquarters: Rotterdam, Netherlands

Magic Blue Airlines was a charter passenger airline based in Rotterdam, Netherlands. It was previously an all-freight operator and intended to operate charter services from Amsterdam Schiphol Airport to Mediterranean holiday destinations starting later in 2005 using BAe ATP aircraft.

In December 2005 the airline filed for bankruptcy.

== Code data ==
- ICAO Code: MJB
- Callsign: MAGIC BLUE

== History ==
The airline was established as Farnair Europe in 1995 and renamed to Farnair Netherlands in 2000. It was wholly owned by FN Holding and in January 2004 was renamed once again as Magic Blue Airlines. In March 2005 it was planning to use two Boeing 757-200s to start charter operations later that year instead of Airbus A300B4-200s as it had previously announced. In May 2005 two ex-Air Europa BAe ATP freighters were shortly to be added to the fleet. In November 2005 the airline wet leased two McDonnell Douglas MD-83s from Fly Air. In December 2005 Magic Blue Airlines filed for bankruptcy, never having started commercial operations. In May 2006, Magic Bird the successor to Magic Blue Airlines finally started operations with a single BAe ATP freighter.

== Fleet ==
The Magic Blue Airlines fleet included the following aircraft (at July 2005):

- 2 BAe ATP (freighters)
- 3 BAe ATP (passenger configured)

All aircraft were leased from BAE Systems.
