= HX =

HX or Hx may refer to:

== Places ==
- HX postcode area, England
- Harolds Cross, Dublin, Ireland

== Science and technology ==
- Dolby HX, in analog audio recording
- .hx, a Haxe source code file
- Hydrogen halide (HX), a series of chemicals
- Medical history (H_{x} or Hx)
- Heat exchanger (HX), in temperature control

== Transport ==
- Hummer HX, a 2008 concept car
- HX convoys of Allied ships, 1939–1945
- RMMV HX range of tactical trucks, 2003
- Hong Kong Airlines (IATA code HX since 2007)
- Kadapa railway station, India (station code:HX)

== Other uses ==
- Ĥ (Hx), a letter in Esperanto
- Human experience; see Customer experience and User experience

== See also ==
- Hex (disambiguation)
