= Magic Bird =

Netherlands cargo airline

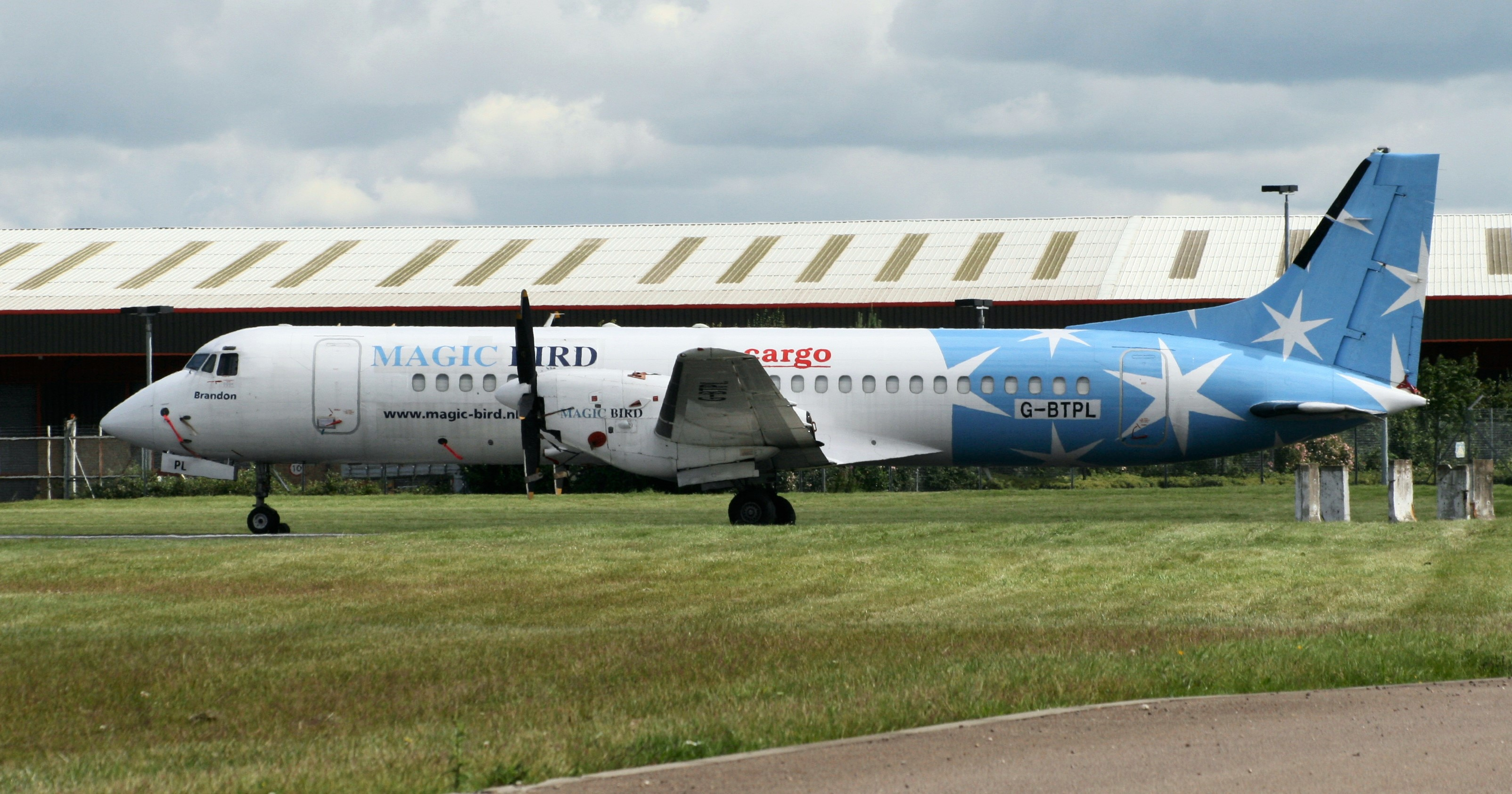
- Bae ATP of Magic Bird
IATA	ICAO	Call sign
-	-	-
- Commenced operations: April 2006
- Ceased operations: May 2007
- Operating bases: Amsterdam Schiphol Airport
- Fleet size: See Fleet below
- Destinations: Sundsvall and Stockholm
- Parent company: See History below
- Headquarters: Amsterdam, Netherlands
- Employees: 12

Magic Bird was a cargo airline based in Amsterdam, Netherlands. It operates services between Sundsvall and Stockholm for the post office in Sweden. Its main base is Amsterdam Schiphol Airport.

== History ==
The airline started operations in April 2006, was owned by an unnamed Luxembourg holding company, and had 12 employees (at March 2007). It was the successor to Magic Blue Airlines which went out of business in December 2005. Magic Bird ceased operations in May 2007 and was declared bankrupt on 3 July 2007.

== Fleet ==
The Magic Bird fleet included the following aircraft (at June 2007):

- Two BAe ATP
- Two Fokker 50F

In June 2006, it was reported that the airline would soon add a second BAe ATP freighter to its fleet and in December 2006 Magic Bird leased an ATP freighter to Atlantic Airlines. In April 2007 the airline leased two ex-Newair Fokker 50F freighters.
