= HollandExel =

Airline of the Netherlands (2003–2005)

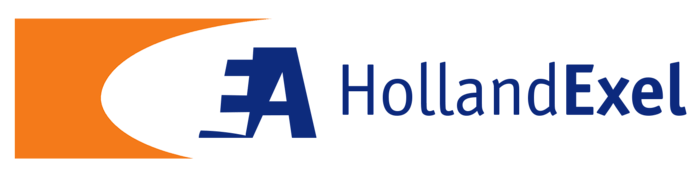

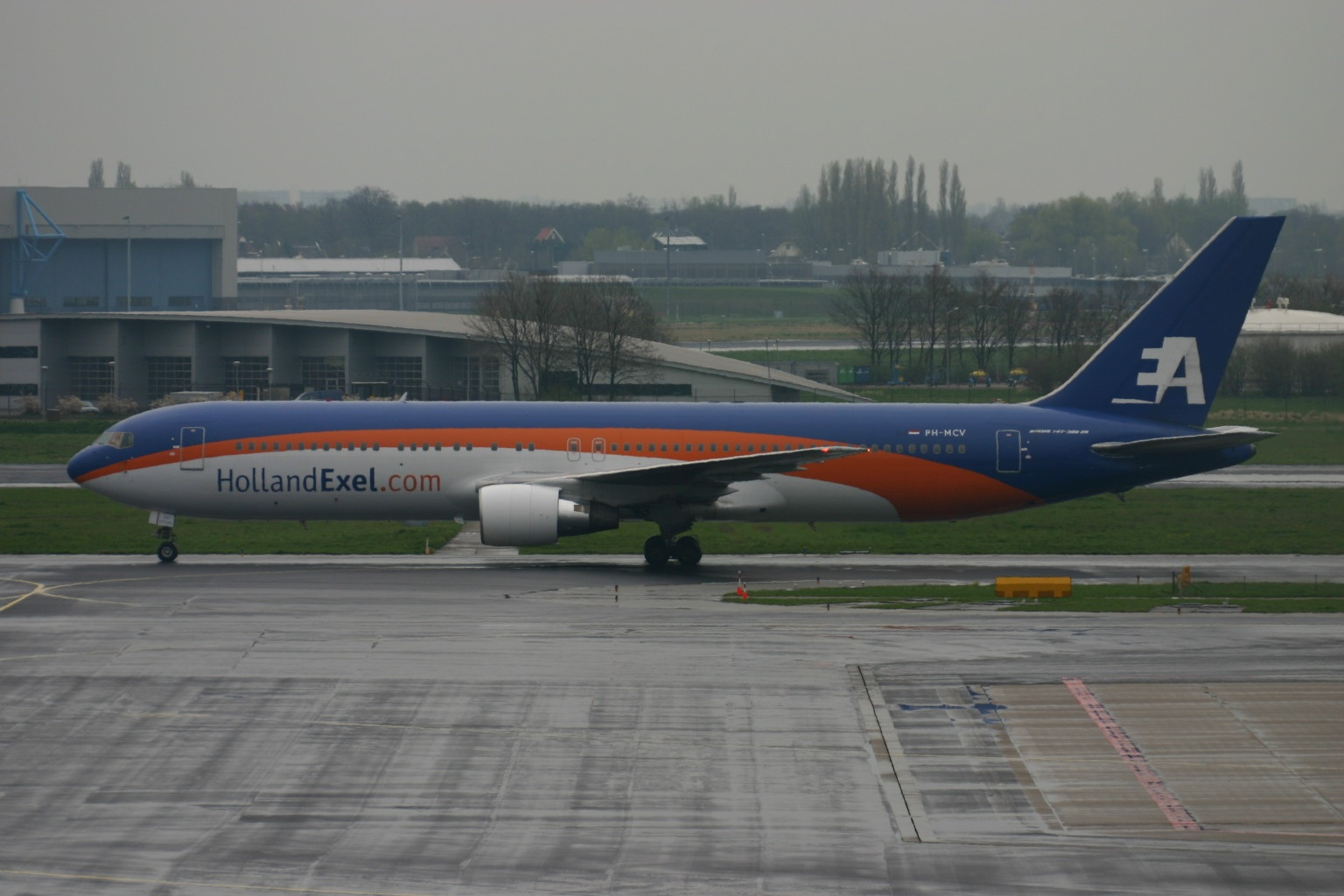
IATA	ICAO	Call sign
YZ	HXL	HOLLAND EXEL
- Founded: 2003
- Commenced operations: February 2004
- Ceased operations: 21 April 2005 (rebranded as Arkefly)
- Operating bases: Amsterdam Airport Schiphol
- Fleet size: 4
- Destinations: 13
- Parent company: ExelAviation Group
- Headquarters: Amsterdam, Netherlands
- Website: www.hollandexel.com

HollandExel (legally Exel Airlines B.V.) was an airline based in Amsterdam, Netherlands. It operated charter services for tour operators.

== History ==
The airline was established in 2003, from the remains of the defunct Air Holland, taking over its fleet of Boeing 767s. It was formerly legally known as ATR Leasing VI and was established as a subsidiary of the Dutch holding company ExelAviation Group. The charter carrier started operations in February 2004 and operated mainly on behalf of TUI Travel and Thomas Cook AG. Two sister airlines were set up; BelgiumExel in Belgium to operate long-haul flights on behalf of Thomas Cook, and DutchCaribbeanExel in the Dutch Antilles for scheduled flights to Amsterdam.

However, after the latter pulled out of all contracts, HollandExel was on the verge of bankruptcy. It had been operating under bankruptcy protection together with the entire ExelAviation Group since January 2005. While EAG had gone bankrupt, HollandExel was purchased by TUI which renamed it Arkefly, making it the Dutch inhouse charter airline for Arke, Holland International and Kras Vakanties.

== Destinations ==
HollandExel operated an international scheduled service to Curaçao and charter services from Amsterdam to the following destinations:

Country	City	Airport	Notes
Brazil	Porto Seguro	Porto Seguro Airport	Charter
Brazil	Recife	Recife/Guararapes–Gilberto Freyre International Airport	Charter
Brazil	Salvador	Salvador Bahia Airport	Charter
Cuba	Holguín	Frank País Airport	Charter
Cuba	Varadero	Juan Gualberto Gómez Airport	Charter
Curaçao	Willemstad	Curaçao International Airport	
Dominican Republic	Puerto Plata	Gregorio Luperón International Airport	Charter
Dominican Republic	Punta Cana	Punta Cana International Airport	Charter
India	Goa	Dabolim Airport	Charter
Jamaica	Montego Bay	Sangster International Airport	Charter
Mexico	Cancún	Cancún International Airport	Charter
Netherlands	Amsterdam	Amsterdam Airport Schiphol	Hub
Sri Lanka	Colombo	Bandaranaike International Airport	Charter

== Fleet ==
HollandExel's all-Boeing fleet comprised the following aircraft:

HollandExel fleet
Aircraft	In service	Orders	Passengers			Notes
Aircraft	In service	Orders	C	Y	Total	Notes
Boeing 767-300ER	4	—	12	248	260	Transferred to Arkefly
Boeing 767-300ER	4	—	12	260	272	Transferred to Arkefly
Total	4	—				

== See also ==
- List of defunct airlines of the Netherlands
