= Martin Schröder (aviator) =

Dutch pilot and founder of Martinair (1931–2024)

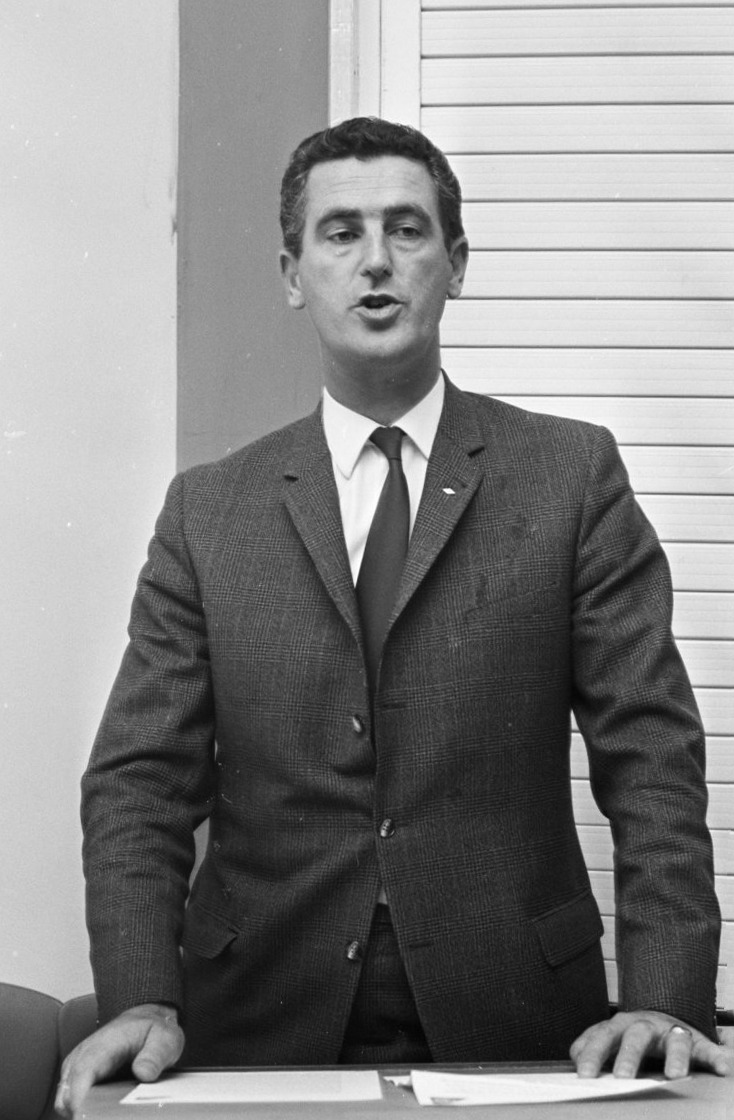
Schröder in 1968

Johan Martin Schröder (13 May 1931 – 2 October 2024) was a Dutch pilot and founder of Martinair, the second Dutch airline (after KLM) and the first Dutch air charter company.

== Life and career ==
Schröder was born in Amsterdam on 13 May 1931.

At the founding in 1958 the company was known as Martin's Air Charter (MAC).

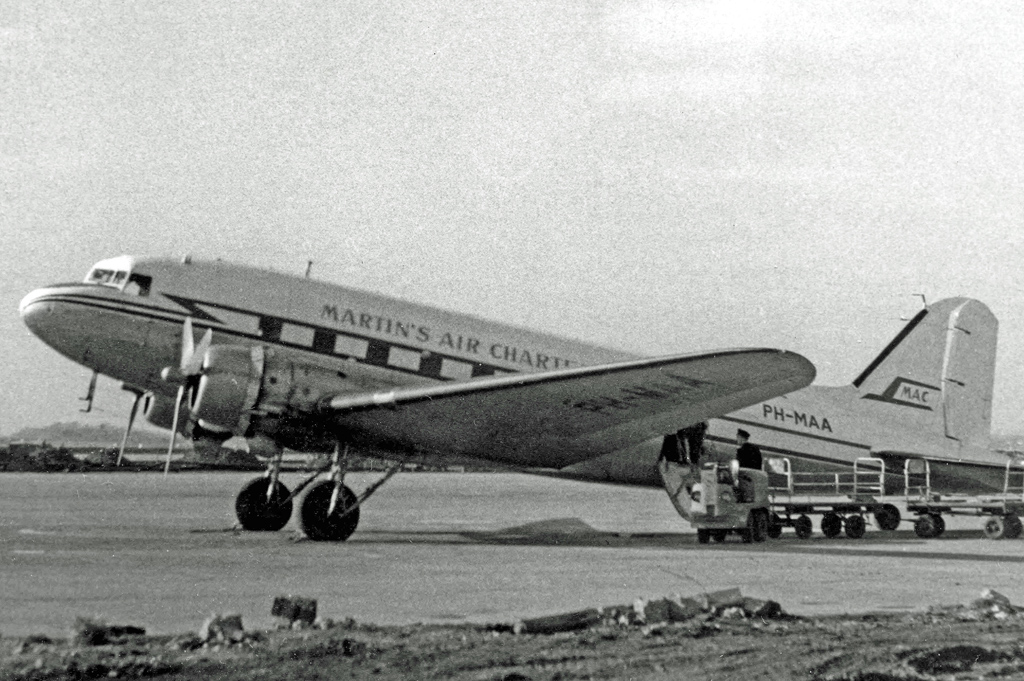
Martin's Air Charter Douglas C-47B freighter in 1961

In 1998 (40 years after the founding of Martinair) Schröder retired as president and CEO. He was succeeded by Aart van Bochove.

Between September 1975 and September 1976 Schröder was chairman of AMREF Flying Doctors Nederland. In 1981 he became an honorary member of the organisation.

His son Marc Schröder founded the unmanned filling station chain Tango and Route Mobiel, a roadside assistance service.

Martin Schröder died in Noordwijk on 2 October 2024, at the age of 93.
