= KLM Aerocarto =

Defunct Dutch airline

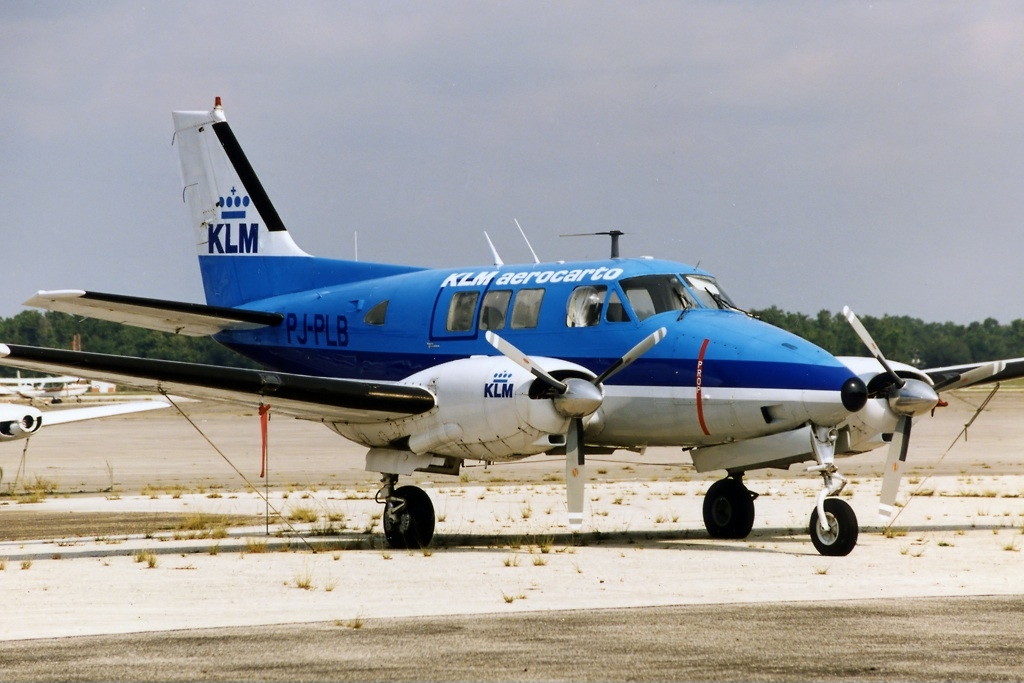
IATA	ICAO	Call sign
KL	—	—
- Founded: 1921

KLM Aerocarto was a Dutch airline that was the phototechnical and cartographic division of KLM Royal Dutch Airlines that carried out extensive international aerial survey and mapping projects.

Aerocarto contributed to the early development of modern aerial surveying and mapping through international projects and collaboration with Dutch universities, integrating aerial photography with scientific research in photogrammetry, geography, and agricultural science for applications in land-use analysis, resource mapping, and topographic and cadastral cartography.

== Significance ==
Aerocarto's activities are considered part of the early development of modern aerial surveying and mapping. Its international projects and interdisciplinary approach contributed to pioneering advances in the application of aerial photography for scientific and economic purposes, helping to expand knowledge of terrain, land use, and resource distribution in multiple parts of the world.

The work of Aerocarto relied on close cooperation with academic institutions in the Netherlands, including Delft University, Leiden University, Utrecht University, and Wageningen University. This collaboration combined practical expertise in aviation and aerial photography with scientific research in fields such as photogrammetry, geography, and agricultural science. The interpretation of aerial images proved particularly valuable for land use analysis, forestry, and the identification of natural resources.

The company's aerial photography and mapping services were widely used both internationally and within the Netherlands, including for large-scale topographic mapping, cadastral documentation, and land-use planning purposes such as urban expansion and land consolidation.

== History ==
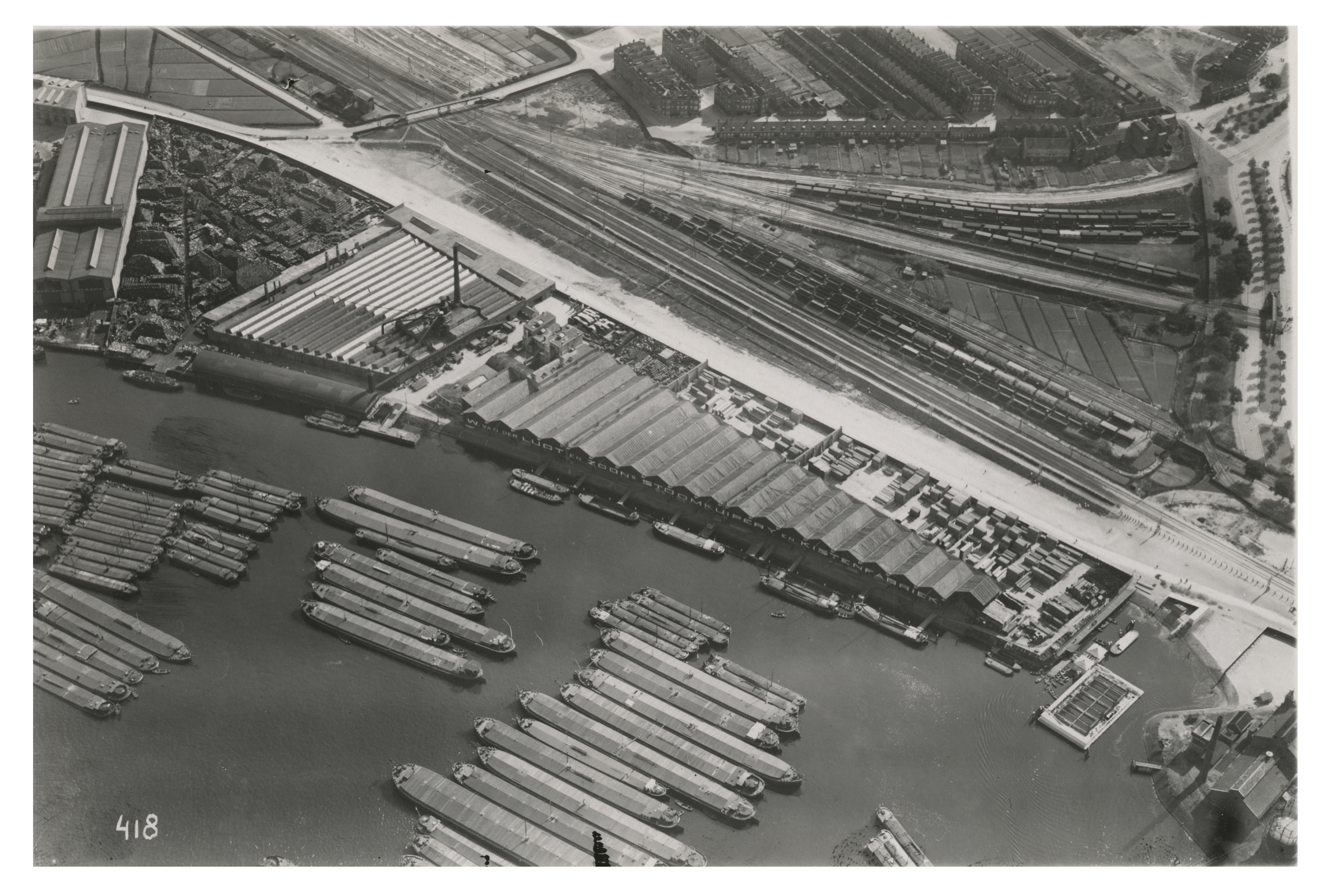
1922 aerial photograph of Mallegat in Rotterdam

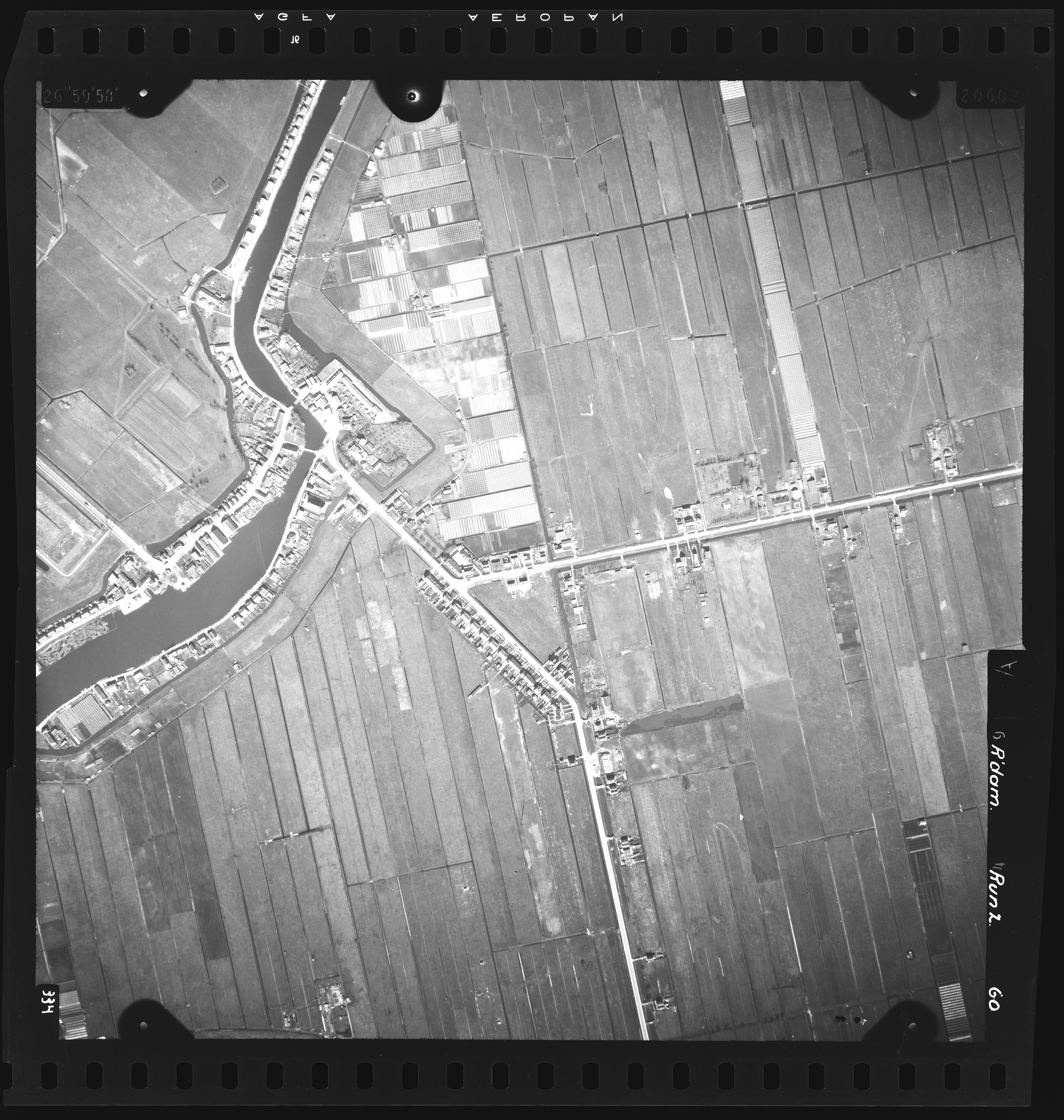
1937 aerial photograph of Prins Alexanderpolder with Terbregge and Rotte

KLM Aerocarto N.V. was founded in 1921, two years after the foundation of the KLM Royal Dutch Airlines by Dr. Albert Plesman. The company originated with early aerial photography flights carried out by pilot Gerrit Johannes Geysendorffer and photographer Corsten and later evolved into a dedicated aerial survey and cartography enterprise equipped with specialized aircraft and photographic and cartographic instruments. After World War II, Aerocarto expanded its operations by establishing its own processing division, enabling independent execution of mapping projects abroad.

Its operations extended to regions in Southeast Asia, South America, and the Caribbean, including Borneo, New Guinea, Venezuela, Suriname, Curaçao and Bonaire. Through these projects, thousands of square kilometres were photographed and mapped, often in previously under-documented or remote areas.

In 1952, the company executed multiple assignments in Syria and four in Iraq, involving both aerial photography and the production of complete topographic maps, supported by ground surveying. One major project included the mapping of approximately 22,500 km² in Syria. The company also worked on a large-scale municipal map and a tourist plan of Damascus and its surroundings. In total, about 17,000 km² was photographed in 1952 at scales ranging from 1:7,000 to 1:40,000. Other large-scale assignments were undertaken in Thailand, Iran and Austria during 1952-1953.

During the mid-1980s the KLM was searching for a company to sell a part of its shares in the company. In 1988 the KLM sold 40% of its shares to American Steward Technical Services Inc.

In March 1994 KLM announced the intended sale of a majority stake in KLM Aerocarto, transferring 51% of its shares to the Belgian cartographic company Eurosense. The decision formed part of KLM's strategy to focus on core aviation activities. The transfer, affecting approximately 63 employees, while the Aerocarto name would be retained and its activities reoriented towards aerial photography and atmospheric research. The sale was realized the following year.

== Fleet ==
- Cessna 402
- Curtiss C 47
- Beech 80
- PA 31
