= Martinair =

Cargo airline of the Netherlands

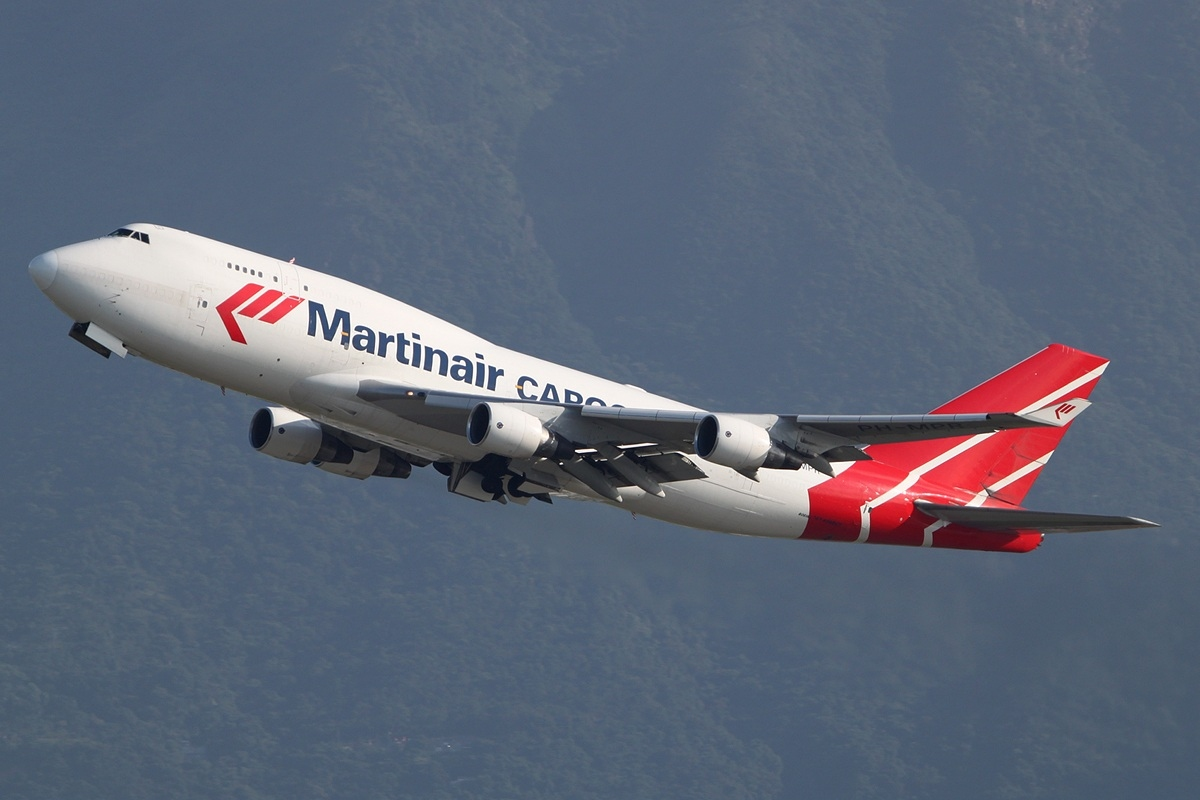
IATA	ICAO	Call sign
MP	MPH	MARTINAIR
- Founded: 24 May 1958; 68 years ago
- Hubs: Amsterdam Airport Schiphol
- Fleet size: 4
- Destinations: 12
- Parent company: KLM
- Headquarters: Haarlemmermeer, Netherlands
- Key people: Marcel de Nooijer (CEO)
- Founder: Martin Schröder
- Website: www.martinair.com

Martinair (legally Martinair Holland N.V.) is a Dutch cargo airline headquartered and based at Amsterdam Airport Schiphol. The airline was founded in 1958 by Martin Schröder, and is currently a subsidiary of Air France–KLM. Since 1 November 2011, Martinair has operated entirely as a cargo airline with scheduled services to 20 destinations worldwide and additional charter flights. Prior to that date, passenger flights were also operated.

== History ==
=== Early years ===
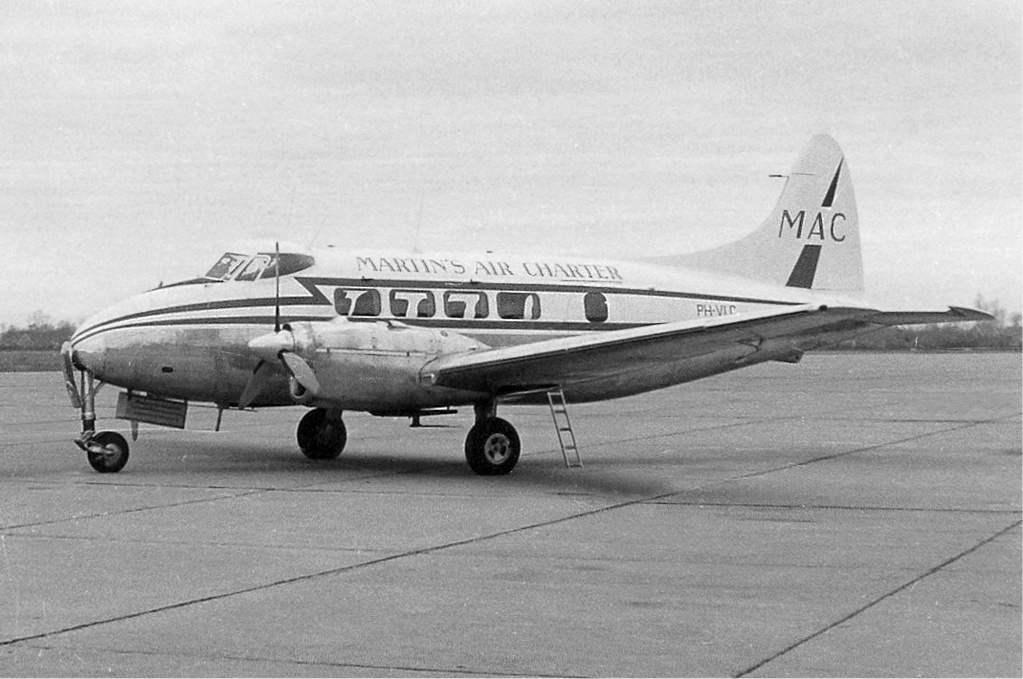
Martin's Air Charter de Havilland Dove in the early 1960s

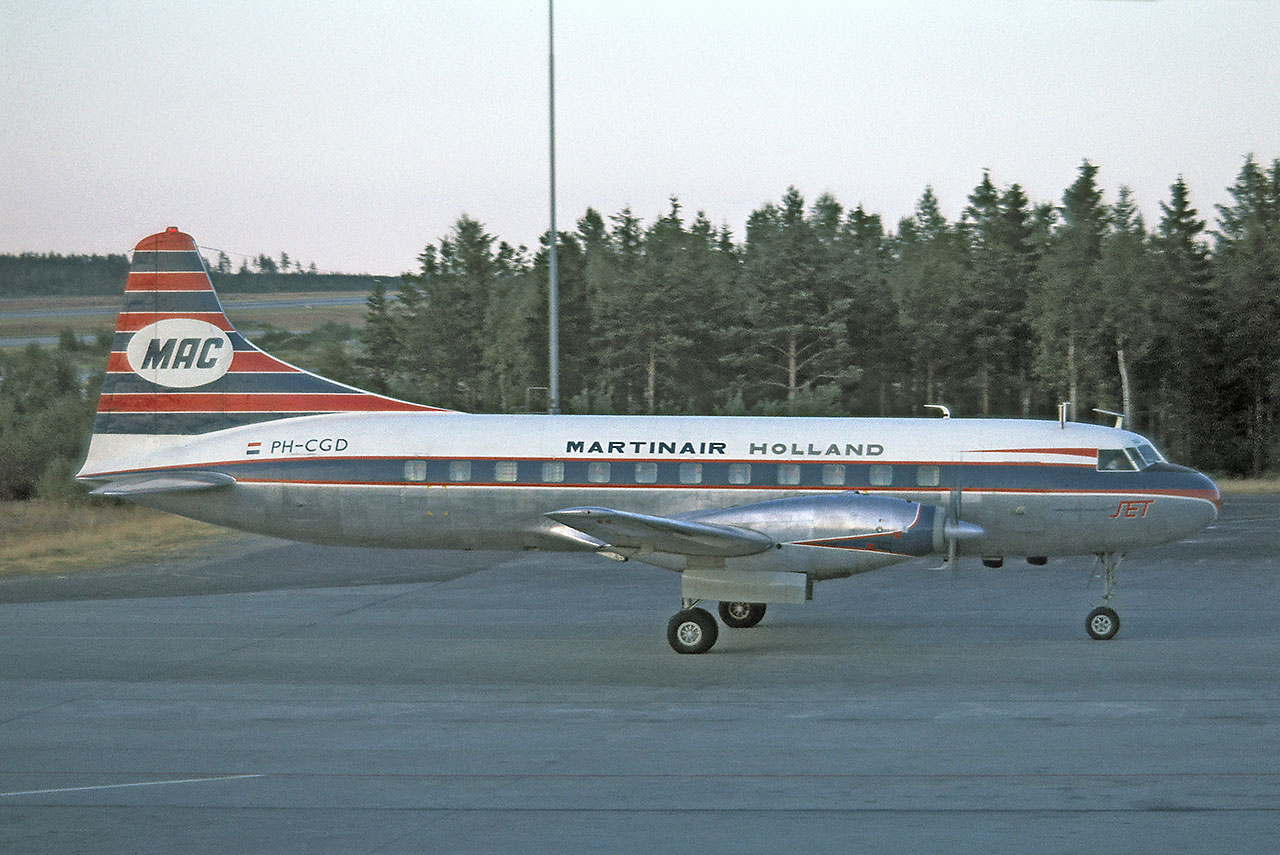
Martinair Convair 640 in 1967

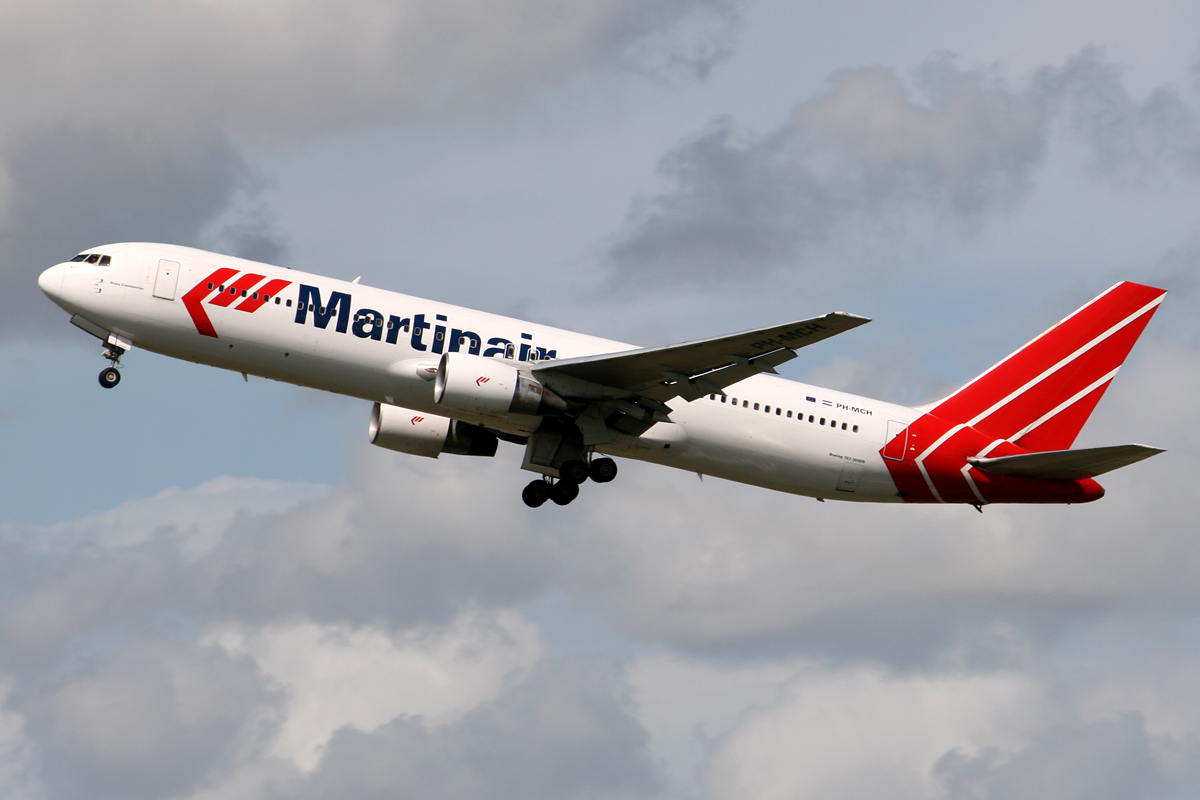
Martinair Boeing 767-300ER

The airline was founded on 24 May 1958 as Martin's Air Charter (MAC), by Martin Schröder and John Block, with ade Havilland Dove, and five employees. In 1963, Schröder sold 49% of the company to four equal shipping company shareholders (12.25% each, these eventually combining as Nedlloyd). KLM would later purchase the 50% that Schröder owned.

The name was changed to Martinair Holland in 1966. A healthy boost came in 1967 with the opening of business to the United States. Martinair became all jet-powered in 1971.

In 1991, the first aircraft with the Martinair Cargo name was introduced, and Holland was dropped from all aircraft. In 1996, Martinair bought a 40% stake in Colombian cargo carrier TAMPA Cargo, based in Medellín, which was increased to 58% in 2003. The share in TAMPA was sold in February 2008 to Avianca, a Colombian company.

Martinair president and CEO Martin Schröder, who received the Tony Jannus Award in 1995 for his contributions to commercial aviation, retired in 1998 from day-to-day activities. Also that year, the European Commission refused to allow KLM to purchase Nedlloyd's shares, which would have made KLM the sole owner.

The first McDonnell Douglas MD-11 was delivered in December 1994. Throughout the next three years, six other brand-new MD-11s were delivered to Martinair. In total, four McDonnell Douglas MD-11CFs (convertible freighter) and two full freighters were delivered. Martinair was the launch customer of the convertible freighter. In 2004, another MD-11F was added to the fleet, this one was previously owned by Swissair, and then converted to full freighter. From 1995 to 2006, some of the convertible MD-11 were reconfigured to transport passengers in the high passenger peaks during the summer period. The passenger configuration was fitted with 390 seats. After 2006, the demand lowered and Martinair no longer needed extra seats.

=== Development since the 2000s ===
In 2006, Martinair purchased four Boeing 747-400s from Singapore Airlines. These passenger planes were converted to freighters to replace the older Boeing 747-200Fs.

In June 2007, Martinair announced that it wanted one shareholder, preferably KLM, and in 2008, permission was obtained from the European Commission. The transfer of remaining shares took place on 31 December 2008. In November 2007, Martinair ceased its short-haul operations to concentrate on its cargo activities and intercontinental flights.

In 2009, three out of the four 747s were stored because of the economic crisis. In September 2010, a restructuring was announced which would involve dropping all passenger services from November 2011, which will be partly taken over by KLM, and leaving only cargo services. In November 2010, the European Commission fined Martinair €29.5 million, following an investigation into price-fixing.

At the end of 2010, two of the 747-400s were leased to Air Cargo Germany. The remaining 747 (PH-MPS) returned into service in May 2011 with an untitled colour scheme, because Martinair was undecided if the plane would remain operating for them.

On 31 October 2011, Martinair ceased passenger service, which it had operated since its founding in 1958. Martinair had passenger service throughout Europe, the Americas, Asia, and Africa from Amsterdam. The last passenger flight took place on 31 October 2011, leaving it as a freight carrier only.

In March 2015, Air France-KLM announced an intention to shrink their dedicated cargo operations. As a result, all of Martinair's McDonnell Douglas MD-11Fs were phased out by 2016 without replacement. Additionally, 330 jobs were cut due to the downsizing.

== Corporate affairs ==
=== Offices ===
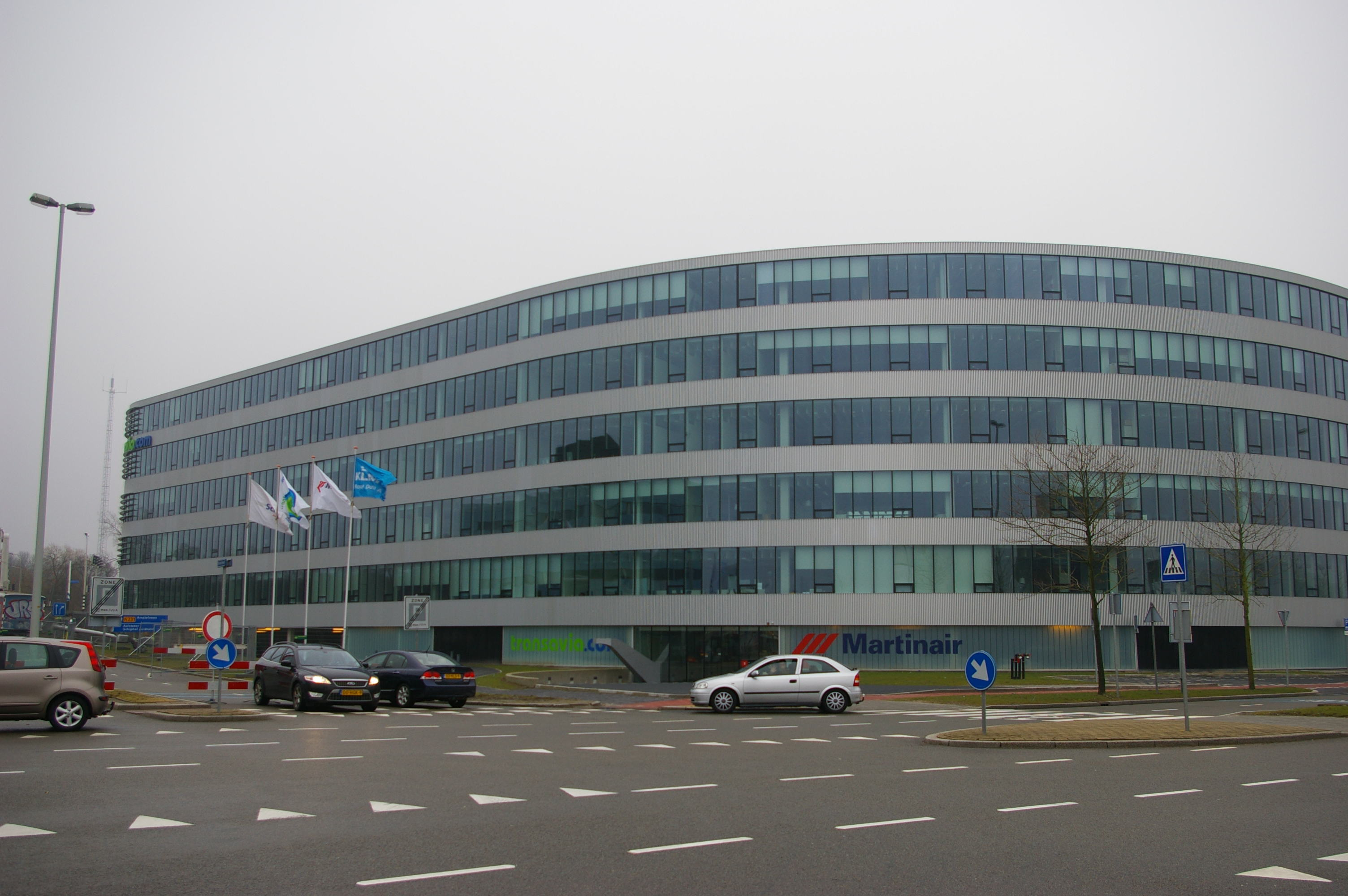
TransPort Building houses the head offices of Martinair and Transavia

Martinair has its head office in the TransPort Building, Schiphol East, on the grounds of Amsterdam Airport Schiphol, Haarlemmermeer, Netherlands. Martinair moved to its current head office on Friday 4 June 2010. The TransPort Building, developed by Schiphol Real Estate, houses both Martinair and Transavia, which moved into TransPort on 3 May 2010.

Construction on the building, which has 10,800 square metres (116,000 sq ft) of lettable space, began on 17 March 2009. Schiphol Group and the architect firm Paul de Ruiter designed the building, while De Vries and Verburg, a firm of Stolwijk, constructed the building. The Dutch Green Building Council awarded its first Building Research Establishment Environmental Assessment Method (BREEAM-NL) certificate to Schiphol Real Estate for building the TransPort Building. In 2011, the United States Green Building Council awarded TransPort the Leadership in Energy and Environmental Design (LEED) certification. A parking facility is located beneath the TransPort building, with parking available by payment.

The airline previously occupied the Schiphol Center (Dutch: Schiphol Centrum) at Schiphol Airport. After Martinair moved into the new building, Martinair sold its old head office back to the airport.

In addition to its headquarters at Amsterdam Airport Schiphol, Martinair operates offices around the globe. The first international office has been opened in Hong Kong in 1975. Martinair USA, later Martinair Americas, originally operated in New York City, but the United States operations office moved to Boca Raton, Florida, in the Miami Metropolitan Area in 1993. This office moved again and is currently located in Doral, Florida, in the Miami area. This office is located in the Doral Corporate Center One.

=== Subsidiaries ===
The Martinair Flight Academy was a flight academy that was based at Lelystad Airport for both private pilot training and airline transport pilot training. It was moved to Groningen Airport in the spring of 2020 during the COVID-19 pandemic to be integrated with the KLM Flight Academy. At the time when they moved to Groningen, MFA operated a fleet of four Socata TB-10s (registered PH-MLO, PH-MLQ, PH-MLR and PH-MLS), two Socata TB-20s (registered PH-MLK and PH-MLL) and a single Diamond DA-42NG Twin Star Platinum (registered PH-MFA), which was added to the fleet in 2011. Additional training was provided by an Alsim 200 FNPT-II MCC simulator.

Additionally, Martinair operates the Regional Jet Center, a technical service center for aircraft maintenance.

== Destinations ==
As of November 2022, Martinair operates scheduled freight services within the Air France-KLM cargo network from Amsterdam-Schiphol to 12 destinations in Africa, North and South America, as well as additional charters. The company ended its additional passenger operations on 31 October 2011 after 53 years of service.

== Fleet ==
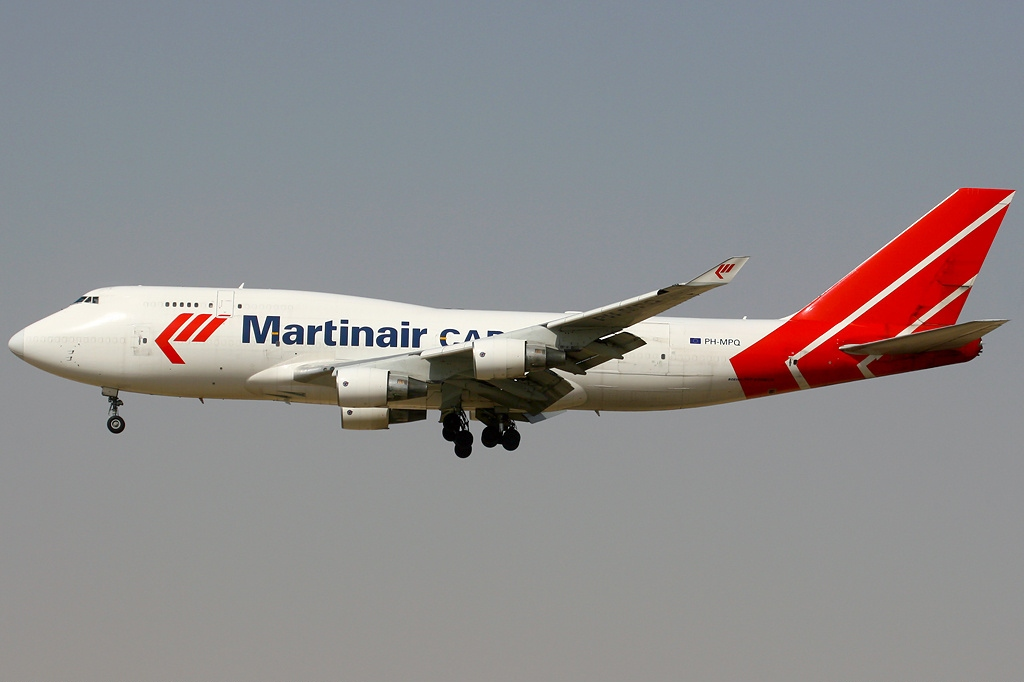
Martinair Boeing 747-400BCF

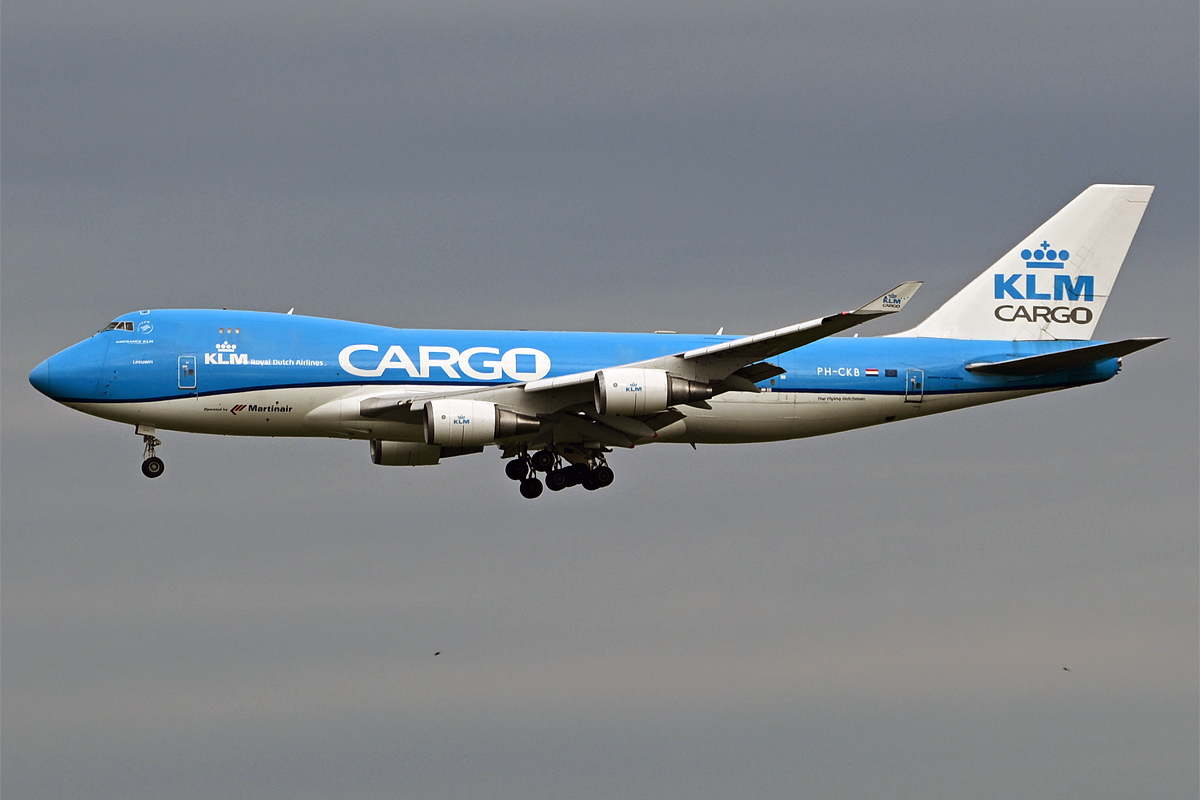
Martinair Boeing 747-400ERF, operated for KLM Cargo

As of April 2026, Martinair operates the following aircraft:

Martinair fleet
Aircraft	In service	Orders	Cargo capacity	Notes
Airbus A350F	—	3	TBA	Deliveries from mid 2027. To replace Boeing 747-400s.
Boeing 747-400BCF	1	—	113,489 kg	Sole aircraft wearing Martinair livery. To be retired and replaced by Airbus A350F.
Boeing 747-400ERF	3	—	124,012 kg	Wearing KLM Cargo livery with 'Operated by Martinair' decals. To be retired and replaced by Airbus A350F.
Total	4	3		

Additional freight aircraft are jointly operated under the Air France-KLM Cargo brand, in which Martinair participates.

Martinair retired fleet
Aircraft	Number	Introduced	Retired	Replacement	Notes
McDonnell Douglas MD-11F	9	1996	2016	Boeing 747-400BCF/ERF	Also included the MD-11CF.

== Incidents and accidents ==
- On 4 December 1974, Martinair Flight 138, a Douglas DC-8, operating on behalf of Garuda Indonesian Airways (present day Garuda Indonesia), flew into the side of a mountain while on landing approach in Colombo, Sri Lanka. All 191 passengers and crew on board were killed.
- On 21 December 1992, Martinair Flight 495, a McDonnell Douglas DC-10, crashed during landing at Faro Airport, Portugal, killing 56 people (including two crew members) out of 340 on board. The cause of the accident was microburst-induced wind shear in combination with crew errors which included the continuation of an un-stabilized approach and the relative passivity of the captain.
- On 30 August 2013, a Martinair MD-11 Freighter on an international flight from Rafael Hernandez Airport in Aguadilla, Puerto Rico, to London Stansted Airport in London, England, suffered substantial damage after a fire broke out on engine number one during its takeoff roll. While there were no injuries among the aircraft's crew, the airplane suffered damage on one engine, nacelles and structure. The takeoff was cancelled.
- On 8 July 2019, Martinair PH-CKA, a Boeing 747-400 operating as Flight 8372 from O. R. Tambo International Airport to Robert Gabriel Mugabe International Airport in Harare, Zimbabwe lost part of a flap while on final approach for landing at the airport. The plane landed safely, and was eventually repaired on the ground.
- On 14 January 2020, Martinair Flight 6912, a Boeing 747-400, was raided by customs officials at Ministro Pistarini International Airport in Ezeiza, Buenos Aires, Argentina, who found 84 kilograms (185 lb) of cocaine hidden between cargo pallets.
