= Air Holland =

Airline of the Netherlands (1984–2004)

IATA	ICAO	Call sign
GG	HLN	ORANGE
- Founded: 1984
- Ceased operations: 25 March 2004
- Operating bases: Amsterdam Schiphol Airport
- Fleet size: 21
- Destinations: Charters & Scheduled
- Headquarters: Oude Meer, Netherlands
- Key people: A.R. Marx (CEO, 1991–2004)
- Founder: John Nicolaas Block (First CEO, 1984–1991)
- Website: airholland.nl

Air Holland Charter B.V. was an airline based in the Netherlands. It operated passenger and cargo charters to Africa, Asia and the Mediterranean, as well as dry and wet leasing of aircraft to other airlines. It ceased operations on 25 March 2004. The airline was headquartered in Oude Meer, Haarlemmermeer.

== History ==
Air Holland was founded in 1984 by John Block. It took a while for the airline to gain its operating certificate after KLM and Transavia attempted to stop the airline from getting it. In the early 1990s, Transavia made a failed attempted to purchase Air Holland.

In 1991, Air Holland had to temporarily suspend all operations due to financial difficulties and a loss of DFL 30 million for the end of 1990. On 20 December 1991 Air Holland took to the skies again under A.R. Marx's management.

On 20 February 2004 Air Holland re-suspended its operations. Its operations, flights, and aircraft were taken over by HollandExel from the Amsterdam businessman Erik de Vlieger. On 25 March 2004 the airline ceased operations due to financial difficulties.

== Fleet ==
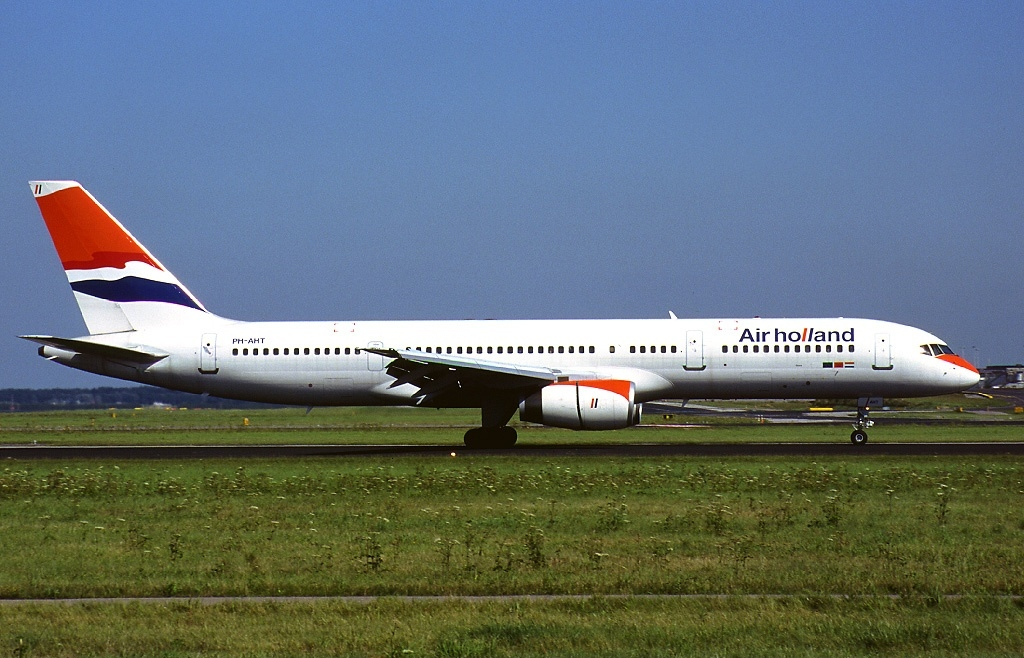
An Air Holland Boeing 757-200 taxiing at Amsterdam Schiphol Airport in 2002

Air Holland only operated Boeing aircraft. Its fleet consisted of the following:

Air Holland fleet
Aircraft	Total	Introduced	Retired	Notes
Boeing 727-200	3	1985	1988	
Boeing 737-300	3	1997	2000	
Boeing 757-200	11	1988	2004	
Boeing 767-200ER	1	1990	1991	Leased from Britannia Airways
Boeing 767-300ER	3	2002	2004	Transferred to HollandExel

== See also ==
- List of defunct airlines of the Netherlands
