= Air Exel =

Regional airline of the Netherlands (1991–2005)

IATA	ICAO	Call sign
XT	AXL	EXEL COMMUTER
- Founded: 26 April 1991 (as Air Exel Commuter)
- Commenced operations: January 1998 (as KLM Exel); 6 November 2004 (as Air Exel Netherlands)
- Ceased operations: 31 January 2005
- Hubs: Maastricht Aachen Airport
- Secondary hubs: Eindhoven Airport
- Frequent-flyer program: Flying Dutchman
- Parent company: KLM (1998–2004)
- Headquarters: Maastricht, Limburg, Netherlands
- Key people: Harm Prins (CEO)

Air Exel was a Dutch airline based in Maastricht in the Netherlands, operating scheduled and chartered flights out of Eindhoven Airport and Maastricht Aachen Airport to several domestic and international destinations.

== History ==
The airline was established on 26 April 1991 as Air Exel Commuter on a co-operational base with Dutch national carrier KLM. Scheduled flights were launched on 1 May of the same year. As part of the parent's move to integrate the services of its feeders, the company was renamed to KLM Exel in January 1998. On 6 November 2004, the co-operation with KLM ended, and the airline became Air Exel Netherlands. One month later, in December 2004, Air Exel's Chief Executive Officer, Harm Prins, was arrested on charges of fraud, blackmail, and money laundering. The investigation brought to light financial difficulties with Air Exel, which was subsequently shut down on 31 January 2005.

== Destinations ==
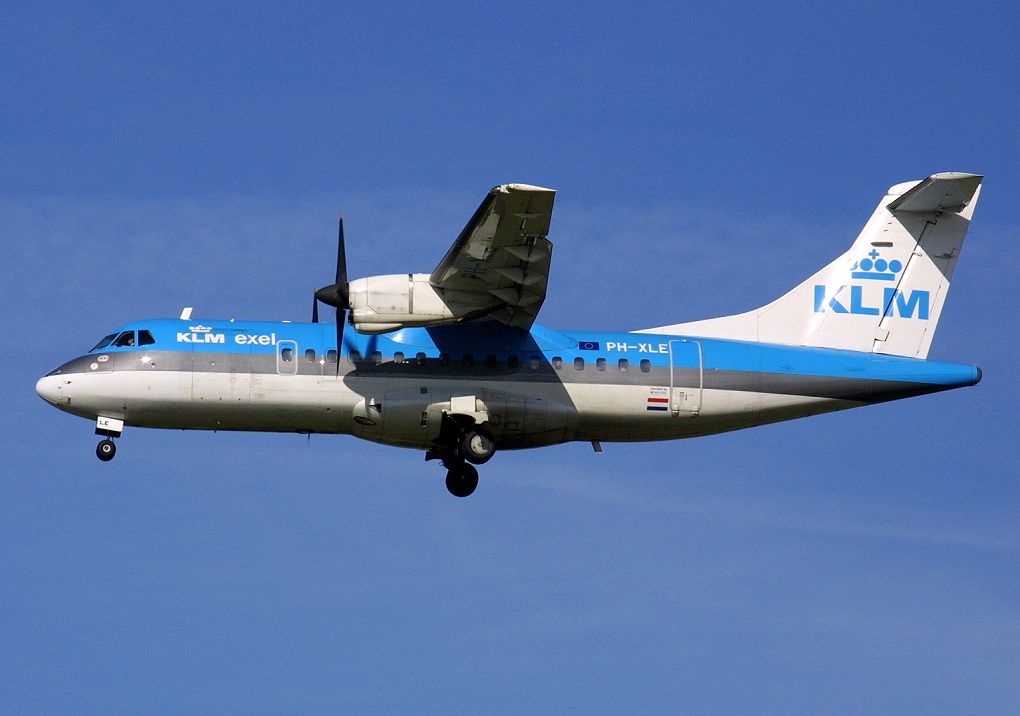
An ATR 42 of KLM Exel approaches Maastricht Aachen Airport in 2002.

Upon closure, Air Exel operated scheduled flights to the following destinations:

France

- Nantes – Nantes Atlantique Airport
- Paris – Charles de Gaulle Airport
- Saint-Étienne – Saint-Étienne–Bouthéon Airport
- Strasbourg – Strasbourg Airport

Italy

- Cuneo – Cuneo International Airport
- Milan – Milan Malpensa Airport

Netherlands

- Amsterdam – Amsterdam Airport Schiphol
- Eindhoven – Eindhoven Airport (secondary hub)
- Maastricht – Maastricht Aachen Airport (main hub)

Norway

- Kristiansand – Kjevik Airport

United Kingdom

- London – London Stansted Airport

Germany

- Hamburg – Fuhlsbüttel Airport

== Fleet ==
Over the years, the KLM Exel/Air Exel fleet consisted of the following aircraft types:

KLM Exel/Air Exel former fleet
Aircraft	Introduced	Retired	Total (at closure)
ATR 42	1998	2005	2
ATR 72	1999	2005	1
Embraer EMB 120 Brasilia	1998	2005	2
Embraer ERJ 145	2000	2004	3

=== Historic fleet ===
Air Exel's fleet consisted of:

Registration	Type	remarks
PH-XLC	ATR 42-320	
PH-XLD	ATR 42-320	
PH-XLE	ATR 42-320	
PH-XLH	ATR 72-201F	
PH-XLI	ATR 42-320	
PH-XLK	ATR 42-320	
PH-XLL	ATR 42-320	
PH-XLM	ATR 42-320	
PH-BRL	EMB 120RT	
PH-XLA	EMB 120RT	
PH-XLB	EMB 120RT	As a wreck at Maastricht Aachen Airport until 2022.
PH-XLF	EMB 120ER	
PH-XLG	EMB 120RT	
PH-RXA	E145MP	
PH-RXB	E145MP	
PH-RXC	E145LR	
