= DutchBird =

Netherlands charter airline

IATA	ICAO	Call sign
5D	DBR	DUTCHBIRD
- Founded: 2000
- Commenced operations: November 22, 2000
- Ceased operations: December 2004
- Operating bases: Amsterdam Schiphol Airport
- Fleet size: 5
- Parent company: Bimoss Holdings
- Headquarters: Amsterdam, Netherlands
- Key people: Hans Mosselman (Founder)
- Website: www.dutchbird.nl

DutchBird was a charter airline based in Amsterdam, Netherlands. It operated charter services to the Mediterranean, Egypt, Tunisia and the Canary Islands for a number of holiday companies. Its main base was Amsterdam Airport Schiphol.

== History ==
The airline was established in 2000 and started operations on November 22, 2000. It was founded by Hans Mosselman, CEO of Sudtours Travel, and began operations with a Boeing 757 aircraft leased from Condor.

From 2001 to 2003, DutchBird was awarded “The best Dutch charter airline”. DutchBird's special family oriented service included attractive extras for parents who traveled with children. Frequent passengers included conference members, symphony orchestras and footballers of AFC Ajax. DutchBird was the “Official Carrier of Ajax” since September 2002.

On November 25, 2004, ExelAviation Group attempted to purchase DutchBird, but was later cancelled.

All flights were stopped by December 2004 and the airline went under Dutch bankruptcy protection on January 27, 2005.

== Fleet ==
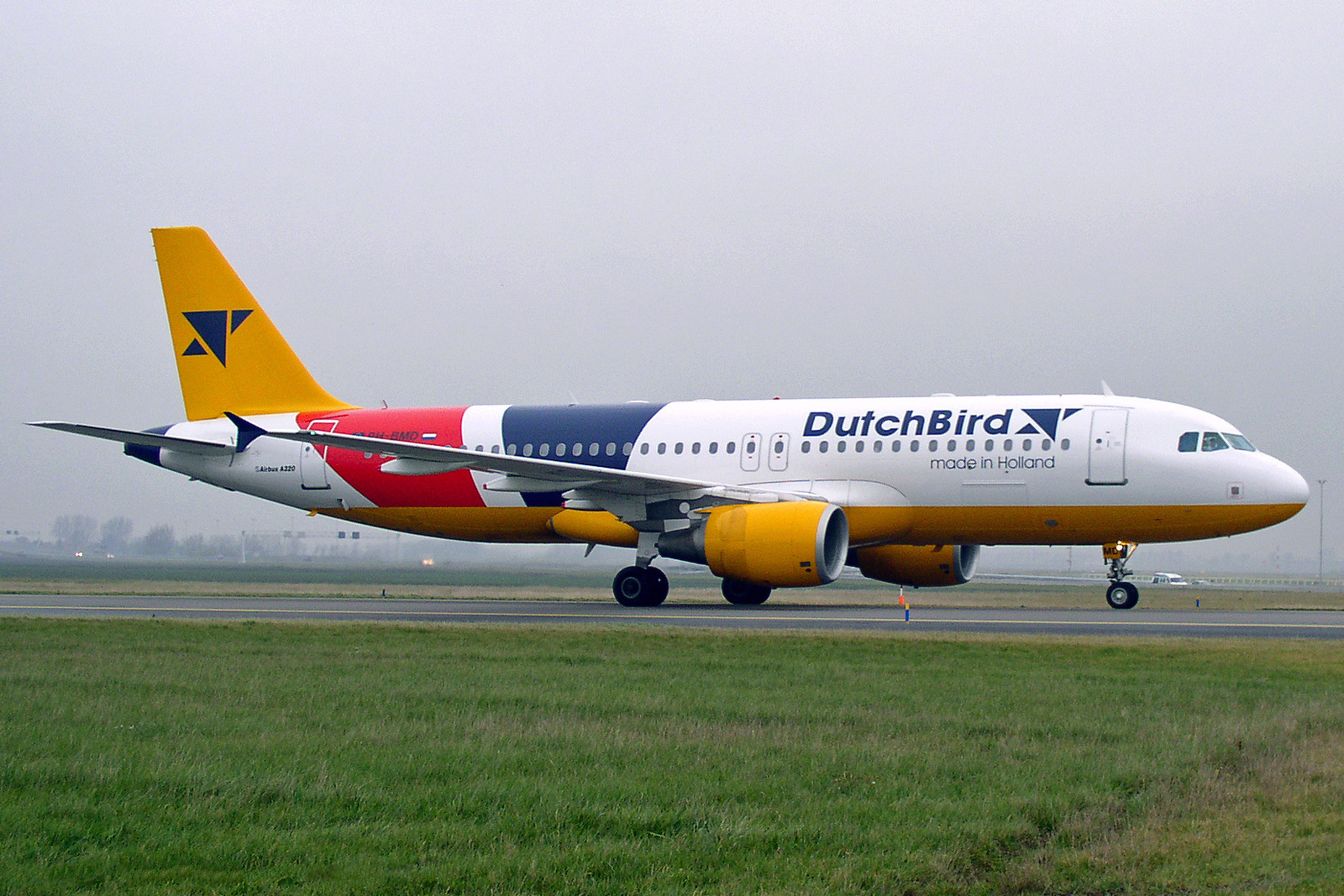
A DutchBird Airbus A320-200 at Amsterdam Schiphol Airport in 2003

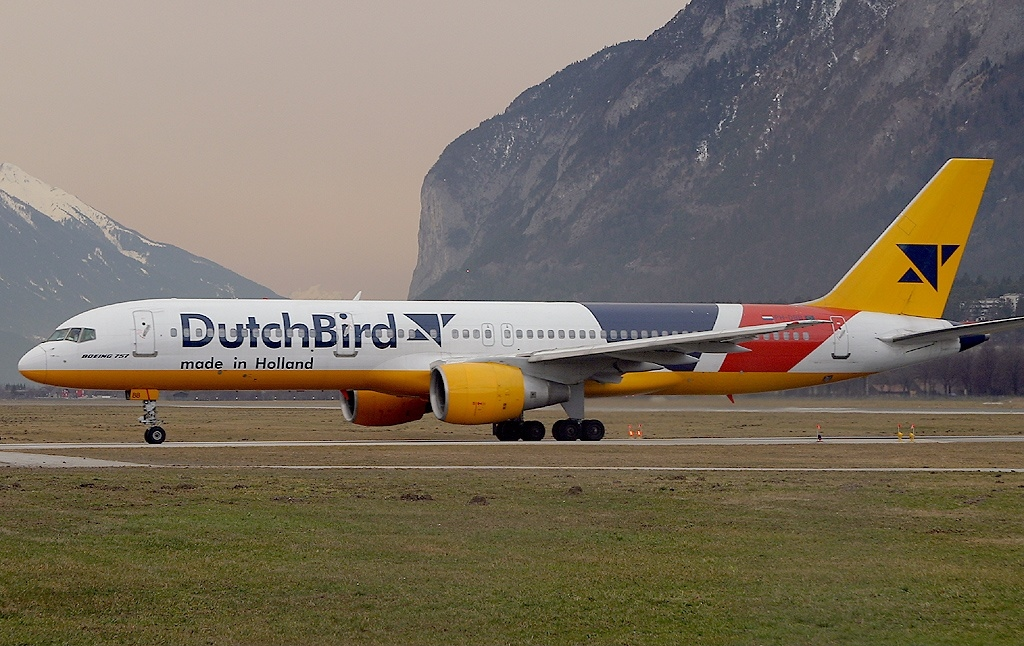
A DutchBird Boeing 757-200 at Innsbruck Airport in 2004

The DutchBird fleet consisted of the following aircraft:

DutchBird fleet
Aircraft	Total	Introduced	Retired	Notes
Airbus A320-200	2	2003	2004	Sold to Monarch Airlines
Boeing 757-200	3	2000	2004	

== See also ==
- List of defunct airlines of the Netherlands
