= 1991 in aviation =

This is a list of aviation-related events from 1991.

== Events ==
=== January ===
- Air Dolomiti begins flight operations, offering service between Genoa and Trieste, Italy.
- January 8 – At a substantial financial loss, Midway Airlines sells its hub at Philadelphia International Airport in Philadelphia, Pennsylvania, to USAir. The sale leaves Midway Airlines with only its original hub, at Chicago Midway International Airport in Chicago, Illinois.
- January 9 – L'Express Airlines files for Chapter 11 bankruptcy protection due to increasing fuel costs. It continues to fly, however, operating 80 daily flights by the summer of 1991
- January 16 – Eastern Air Lines is dissolved after 64 years of operation. Many of its remaining assets are parceled out to American and Continental Airlines.
- January 17 – Operation Desert Storm begins as U.S.-led forces attack Iraq in a massive air assault after a United Nations deadline for the withdrawal of Iraqi troops from occupied Kuwait passes unheeded. United States Air Force, United States Navy, United States Marine Corps, Royal Air Force, French Air Force, and other Coalition aircraft participate. The F-117 Nighthawk stealth fighter makes its first successful combat sortie, destroying an Iraqi telecommunications facility. U.S. Air Force B-52 Stratofortress bombers based at Barksdale Air Force Base, Louisiana, fly a non-stop 35-hour, 14,000-mile (23,000 km) round-trip mission to strike Iraqi targets, the longest combat mission in history up to that time, and employ the AGM-86 Air-Launched Cruise Missile in combat for the first time. The Iraqi national integrated air defense system collapses within the first two hours after shooting down only one Coalition aircraft (a U.S. Navy F/A-18 Hornet), and the Iraqi leader Saddam Hussein has its commander executed. During the first 14 hours of the bombardment, the attacking aircraft fly more than 1,000 sorties and drop 18,000 tons (16,329,493 kg) of explosives; they lose three of their number – one American, one British, and one Kuwaiti plane – during the day, all to Iraqi ground fire. Iraq loses 10 aircraft in air-to-air combat during the day.
- January 21 – The Soviet Union commissions the "heavy aircraft-carrying missile cruiser" Admiral of the Fleet of the Soviet Union Kuznetsov. A hybrid ship combining the capability of a Western aircraft carrier to operate high-performance fighters for fleet air defense with the heavy shipboard anti-ship missile armament of Soviet guided-missile cruisers, she is the first Soviet or Russian ship with a full-length flight deck similar to that of Western aircraft carriers and the only such ship ever to be built prior to the dissolution of the Soviet Union.
- January 21 – An Iraqi surface-to-air missile shoots down a U.S. Navy F-14 Tomcat and a United States Army attack helicopter is lost to non-combat causes in the Gulf War. Coalition aircraft have flown more than 4,000 sorties against Iraqi forces since Operation Desert Storm began, targeting command-and-control centers, airfields, and Scud short-range ballistic missile launchers. They now shift their focus to Iraqi positions around Basra and along the Iraq-Kuwait border.
- January 22 – In the Gulf War, Iraqi antiaircraft artillery downs a Royal Air Force Tornado ground-attack aircraft and the U.S. Army loses an attack helicopter to non-combat causes. Four U.S. Navy A-6E Intruders disable an Iraqi Navy T43 class minesweeper.
- January 23 – Iraqi antiaircraft fire downs a U.S. Air Force F-16 Fighting Falcon over Kuwait, and a United States Marine Corps AV-8B Harrier II and a U.S. Army attack helicopter are lost to non-combat causes. U.S. Navy A-6E Intruders attack Iraqi ships, disabling a tanker, sinking a Winchester-class hovercraft refueling from the tanker, and sinking a Zhuk-class patrol boat.
- January 24 – Iraqi ground fire shoots down another RAF Tornado, over Basrah, Iraq. Flying an F-15C Eagle, Royal Saudi Air Force Captain Ayedh al-Shamrani, using AIM-9 Sidewinder air-to-air missiles, shoots down two Iraqi Air Force Mirage F1 jets as they approach British Royal Navy ships in the Persian Gulf. U.S. Navy aircraft attack Iraqi Navy ships; A-6Es sink a Zhuk-class patrol boat and Spasilac-class minelayer and cause a minesweeper taking evasive action to strike an Iraqi mine and sink, and a force of A-6Es and F/A-18 Hornets hit four ships in an attack on Umm Qasr naval base. U.S. Chairman of the Joint Chiefs of Staff General Colin Powell announces that during the first week of air attacks on Iraq, Coalition air forces have flown more than 10,000 sorties, knocked out 61 of Iraq's 66 airfields, and shot down 19 Iraqi aircraft in air-to-air-combat, losing 16 of their own number – all to ground fire.
- January 26 – U.S. Air Force F-15C Eagles of the 33rd Tactical Fighter Wing shoot down three Iraqi MiG-23s using AIM-7 Sparrow missiles. U.S. Navy A-6Es attack Kuwait Harbor, hitting an Iraqi patrol boat, and elsewhere hit an Iraqi TNC-45 fast attack boat, leaving both boats burning. The U.S. Navy loses an F/A-18C Hornet to non-combat causes.
- January 27 – Two U.S. Air Force F-15C Eagles of the 53rd Tactical Fighter Squadron shoot down two Iraqi MiG-23s and two Iraqi Mirage F1s 60–100 miles (97–161 km) south of Baghdad using Sparrow and Sidewinder missiles. United States Central Command claims that Iraqi naval losses thus far in the Gulf War total one oil platform, two patrol boats, one tanker, and four unidentified ships presumed sunk and four mine warfare ships, one hovercraft, three patrol boats, and two unidentified vessels confirmed as sunk. Coalition aircraft have inflicted most of the losses.
- January 28 – Iraqi antiaircraft artillery shoots down a U.S. Marine Corps AV-8B Harrier II over Faylakah Island, and a U.S. Army attack helicopter is lost to non-combat causes.
- January 28–29 – U.S. Navy A-6Es conduct two days of attacks on Iraqi ships in Bubiyan Channel, at the Umm Qasr naval base, and in Kuwait Harbor.
- January 29 – U.S. Air Force F-15C Eagles of the 33rd Tactical Fighter Wing shoot down two Iraqi MiG-23s using Sparrow missiles. After a British frigate detects 17 Iraqi small boats in the Persian Gulf carrying commandos for use in a seaborne assault during the Battle of Khafji, Royal Navy Fleet Air Arm Lynx helicopters attack them with Sea Skua missiles. Soon more Lynxes and Royal Navy Sea King Commando and U.S. Navy LAMPS III helicopters – with some of the helicopters using door machine guns and hand grenades – and Royal Air Force Jaguar and U.S. Navy carrier-based A-6E Intruder bombers join in. The attacks sink 14 of the boats and drive the other three ashore, preventing the planned commando operation.
- January 30 – Fleet Air Arm Lynx helicopters (employing Sea Skuas), Royal Air Force Jaguars, and U.S. Navy A-6Es (using Rockeye cluster bombs) attack an Iraqi naval convoy made up of a minesweeper, three fast-attack craft, and three landing craft carrying troops and ammunition, breaking up the second and final seaborne component of Iraqi forces in the Battle of Khafji. The Coalition reports that thus far in the Gulf War it has destroyed or disabled 46 Iraqi naval vessels, although another report at about this time claims the total is about 60. Coalition aircraft have inflicted most of the losses.
- January 31 – An Iraqi shoulder-launched Strela 2 surface-to-air missile hits a U.S. Air Force AC-130H Spectre gunship over Kuwait during the Battle of Khafji; the aircraft crashes into the Persian Gulf, killing all 14 on board. It is the largest Coalition loss of life in a single aviation incident during the Gulf War.

=== February ===
- February 1
  - In the Gulf War, a U.S. Navy A-6E Intruder hits an Iraqi Navy patrol boat near Min-al-Bakr oil terminal, leaving it burning.
  - USAir Flight 1493, a Boeing 737-300 with 89 people on board, collides with Skywest Flight 5569, a Fairchild Metro III carrying 12 people, on a runway at Los Angeles International Airport, in Los Angeles, California, killing 22 people on the USAir plane and everyone aboard the Skywest aircraft. Thirty people on the USAir plane are injured, 13 of them seriously.
- February 2 – Coalition aircraft attack Iraqi Navy vessels at the Al Kalia naval facility, hitting a missile boat with two laser-guided bombs and straddling another with twelve 500-pound (227-kg) bombs; helicopters from the American guided-missile frigate USS Nicholas (FFG-47) engage four Iraqi patrol boats near Maradim Island, destroying one and damaging two; and U.S. Navy A-6Es destroy an Iraqi patrol boat in Kuwait Harbor with two laser-guided bombs. The Coalition claims to have sunk or damaged 83 Iraqi Navy vessels thus far in the Gulf War, with Coalition aircraft inflicting most of the losses. Iraqi antiaircraft artillery shoots down a U.S. Navy A-6E Intruder near Kuwait City, Kuwait, an Iraqi short-range surface-to-air missile downs a U.S. Air Force A-10 Thunderbolt II, and a U.S. Marine Corps AH-1J SeaCobra crashes due to non-combat causes while returning from an armed escort mission.
- February 3
  - Returning from a strike against Iraqi forces, a U.S. Air Force B-52G Stratofortress attempting to land at Diego Garcia crashes on final approach.
  - The Government of Albania establishes the Directorate General of Civil Aviation as Albania's national civil aviation authority. It later will be renamed the Albanian Civil Aviation Authority.
- February 5 – A U.S. Navy F/A-18C Hornet crashes in the northern Persian Gulf while returning to its aircraft carrier from a strike against Iraqi forces.
- February 6
  - Two U.S. Air Force F-15C Eagles of the 36th Tactical Fighter Wing use AIM-9 Sidewinder air-to-air missiles to shoot down four Iraqi Air Force aircraft – two Mikoyan-Gurevich MiG-21s (NATO reporting name "Fishbed") and two Sukhoi Su-25s (NATO reporting name "Frogfoot") – fleeing to Iran at an altitude of about 100 feet (30 m). A U.S. Navy Grumman F-14 Tomcat of Fighter Squadron 1 (VF-1) aboard the aircraft carrier USS Ranger (CV-61) shoots down an Iraqi Mil Mi-8 (NATO reporting name "Hip") helicopter, the last of the five kills F-14s score during the Tomcat's career in U.S. Navy service.
  - A Boeing KC-135E Stratotanker was involved in an accident when two engines on the left wing detached from the aircraft. The pilots managed to execute an emergency landing saving all four crew members onboard. The aircraft was later repair and returned to service.
- February 7
  - U.S. Air Force F-15C Eagles use AIM-7 Sparrow air-to-air missiles to shoot down three Iraqi Air Force Sukhoi Su-22s (NATO reporting name "Fitter") flying to Iran, as well as an Iraqi Mil Mi-24 (NATO reporting name "Hind") helicopter in northern Iraq; a U.S. Navy F-14A Tomcat of Fighter Squadron 1 uses an AIM-9 Sidewinder missile to down an Iraqi Mil Mi-8 (NATO reporting name "Hip") helicopter; and a U.S. Air Force A-10 Thunderbolt II of the 926th Tactical Fighter Group uses 30-mm cannon fire to shoot down an Iraqi Bo 105 helicopter.
  - Unable to find investors in the unprofitable airline Interflug, formerly the national airline of East Germany, German officials announce that it will be dissolved.
- February 8 – A U.S. Air Force A-10 Thunderbolt II uses 30-mm cannon fire to shoot down an Iraqi Alouette III helicopter. U.S. Navy A-6E Intruders neutralize two Iraqi Navy vessels – a training ship and a TNC-45 fast attack craft – at Khor Al Zubair.
- February 9 – A U.S. Navy A-6E badly damages an Iraqi Zhuk-class patrol boat with a Rockeye cluster bomb.
- February 10 – U.S. Navy A-6Es sink two Iraqi Navy patrol boats in the northern Persian Gulf. Iraqi antiaircraft artillery shoots down a U.S. Marine Corps AV-8B Harrier II over southern Kuwait.
- February 10 - Two parked Iraqi Airways Tupulevs are destroyed by Coalition jet fighters at Baghdad Saddam Hussein Int'l airport.
- February 11 – U.S. Air Force F-15C Eagles of the 36th Tactical Fighter Wing use AIM-7 Sparrow missiles to shoot down two Iraqi helicopters.
- February 13 – Two U.S. Air Force F-117A Nighthawk stealth fighters bomb a low structure in Baghdad which the Coalition believes houses an Iraqi military command-and-control facility. The attack destroys an air raid shelter, with Iraq claiming that over 400 civilians in it were killed, although the Coalition stands firm on its claim that the target was a military facility within which Iraq had illegally sheltered civilians to gain a propaganda advantage if they were killed. Iraqi antiaircraft artillery downs a Royal Saudi Air Force F-5E Tiger II fighter over southwestern Iraq.
- February 14 – U.S. Navy A-6E Intruders sink an Iraqi Navy Osa-class missile boat in Kuwait Bay, the last Iraqi naval loss of the Gulf War. Iraqi ground fire shoots down a Royal Air Force Tornado and a Royal Saudi Air Force F-5E Tiger II during strikes on Iraqi forces, and a U.S. Air Force EF-111A Raven electronic warfare aircraft crashes in Saudi Arabia due to battle damage. The United States reports that Coalition airstrikes against Iraqi military forces in Kuwait have destroyed 1,300 of Iraq's 4,280 tanks, 850 of its 2,870 armored personnel carriers, and 1,100 of its 3,110 artillery pieces there.
- February 15 – Iraqi shoulder-launched surface-to-air missiles shoot down two U.S. Air Force A-10 Thunderbolt II aircraft while they are attacking Iraqi Republican Guard forces, and a U.S. Navy A-6E Intruder crashes in Saudi Arabia due to battle damage. A U.S. Air Force F-15E strike Eagle on an anti-Scud ballistic missile mission destroys a hovering Iraqi helicopter with a laser-guided bomb; the helicopter is the last Iraqi aircraft destroyed in the air during the Gulf War.
- February 16 – A U.S. Air Force F-16C crashes while making an instrument landing approach in Saudi Arabia.
- February 17 - A Ryan International Airlines DC-9-15RC crashed due to icing at Cleveland Hopkins International Airport, killing both crew members on board.
- February 18 – A U.S. Air Force F-16 goes down in Kuwait 40 miles (64 km) north of the Saudi border.
- February 19 – Iraqi antiaircraft artillery shoots down a U.S. Air Force OA-10A Thunderbolt II airborne forward air control aircraft over Kuwait.
- February 21 – Iraqi forces shoot down a U.S. Army Bell OH-58 Kiowa helicopter as it returns from a border reconnaissance mission, and U.S. military forces lose three other helicopters and an F-16 fighter in non-combat crashes. In five weeks of air strikes against Iraq and Iraqi forces in Kuwait, Coalition aircraft have flown over 88,000 sorties, with the loss of 22 American and nine other aircraft, all to enemy ground fire.
- February 23 – Iraqi antiaircraft artillery downs a U.S. Marine Corps AV-8B Harrier II near Ali Al Salem Air Base in Kuwait.
- February 24 – The U.S.-led Coalition's ground attack against Iraqi forces in Kuwait begins. In its first hours, 60 United States Army UH-60 Blackhawk helicopters carry the 1st Brigade of the 101st Airborne Division (Air Assault) 75 miles (120 km) inside Iraq, where the brigade seizes a forward operating base. The brigade's sudden appearance unnerves Iraqi defenders so badly that they surrender quickly, with some surrendering to helicopters before American troops begin to land.
- February 25 – 63 U.S. Army Blackhawk helicopters lift the 3rd Brigade of the 101st Airborne Division (Air Assault) 155 miles (250 km) behind Iraqi ground forces attempting to retreat from Kuwait, cutting them off. This will allow Coalition aircraft and ground forces to annihilate the trapped Iraqi units on Highway 8 between Basra and Baghdad. Iraqi antiaircraft artillery shoots down a U.S. Marine Corps AV-8B Harrier II southeast of Kuwait City, and also claims an American OV-10D Bronco and an American attack helicopter.
- February 27
  - Fearing that its arrival overhead presages a devastating Coalition airstrike against their positions, 40 Iraqi soldiers on Faylaka Island surrender to a U.S. Navy Pioneer unmanned aerial vehicle flying a reconnaissance mission from the battleship USS Wisconsin (BB-64). It is the first time in history that troops surrender to an unmanned vehicle.
  - An American OV-10D Bronco becomes the last Coalition aircraft lost in combat during the Gulf War.
- February 28 – The U.S.-led Coalition calls a ceasefire with Iraq, with all Iraqi forces driven out of Kuwait and airpower having neutralized practically all of Iraq's ability to make war. Coalition aircraft have shot down 40 Iraqi aircraft while losing none of their own in air-to-air combat.

=== March ===
- OceanAir – the future Azores Airlines – begins operations as a non-scheduled carrier.
- March 3
  - At ceasefire talks with Iraqi representatives at Safwan, Iraq, American General Norman Schwarzkopf, Jr. warns them that Coalition forces will shoot down any Iraqi aircraft flying over the country.
  - United Airlines Flight 585, a Boeing 737-291, experiences a rudder hardover on final approach to Colorado Springs Municipal Airport at Colorado Springs, Colorado, and dives into the ground, killing all 25 people on board. First Officer Patricia Eidson becomes the first female pilot to die in an accident involving an American pure-jet airliner.
- March 5
  - Aeropostal Alas de Venezuela Flight 108, a McDonnell Douglas DC-9, crashes into a mountain shrouded in fog near La Valesa, Venezuela, killing all 45 people on board.
  - Blackhawk International Airways is incorporated.
- March 9 – Retired American baseball player Jim Hardin is killed when the propeller of his Beechcraft 35-C-33A Bonanza fails due to metal fatigue just after takeoff from Key West International Airport in Key West, Florida, and the plane crashes while he is attempting to return to the airport to make an emergency landing.
- March 16 – While American singer Reba McEntire and her husband sleep in a nearby hotel, eight members of her band along with the pilot and copilot are killed when a chartered Hawker Siddeley DH.125-1A/522 crashes into Otay Mountain 10 minutes after takeoff from Brown Field Municipal Airport in San Diego, California.
- March 20 – A U.S. Air Force F-15C Eagle of the 36th Tactical Fighter Wing uses an AIM-9 Sidewinder air-to-air missile to shoot down an Iraqi Air Force Sukhoi Su-22 (NATO reporting name "Fitter") which is violating the post-Gulf War Coalition prohibition against Iraqi military flights.
- March 22 – A 36th Tactical Fighter Wing F-15C again downs an Iraqi Su-22 with a Sidewinder. Another Su-22 accompanying the first one crashes while maneuvering to evade the approaching F-15C. The pilot of an Iraqi Pilatus PC-9 trainer bails out when American aircraft approach his plane.
- March 26 – Four armed men claiming to be members of the Pakistan Peoples Party hijack Singapore Airlines Flight 117, an Airbus A310-300 with 123 other people on board, during a flight from Kuala Lumpur, Malaysia, to Singapore. After the aircraft lands at Singapore Changi Airport, they demand the release of Asif Ali Zardari and other members of their party from jail. The following morning, they push two stewards from the plane onto the tarmac, injuring them, and threaten to begin killing passengers, after which the Singapore Armed Forces Commando Formation storms the plane and kills all four hijackers without further injury to anyone else on board.

=== April ===
- KLM Cityhopper commences operations after NLM CityHopper and NetherLines merged.
- With negotiations to end apartheid in South Africa underway since the previous year, Air Zaïre begins service to Johannesburg, South Africa.
- April 4 – United States Senator H. John Heinz III and six others are killed when his Piper Aerostar and a Bell 412 helicopter collide over Lower Merion Township, Pennsylvania, and crash.
- April 5 – Atlantic Southeast Airlines Flight 2311, an Embraer 120RT Brasilia, crashes on approach to Brunswick, Georgia, killing all 23 people on board. Among the dead are former United States Senator John Tower, his daughter Marian, astronaut Manley "Sonny" Carter, American College of Physicians president-elect Dr. Nicholas Davies, and professional golfer Davis Love, Jr., the father of golfer Davis Love III.
- April 6 – Operation Provide Comfort begins to bring aid to civilians in northern Iraq. It includes a no-fly zone for Iraqi military aircraft over Iraq north of the 36th parallel enforced by American, British, and French aircraft, and continues until July 24.
- April 18 – Air Tahiti Flight 805, a Dornier 228-212 registered as F-OHAB, made an unsuccessful ditching attempt after losing both its Garrett TPE331 propellers. Out of the 22 occupants onboard, 10 were killed.
- April 30 – Interflug, formerly the national airline of East Germany, makes its last flight, a Tupolev Tu-134 flying the Berlin-Vienna-Berlin route. Interflug subsequently is dissolved and its assets liquidated.

=== May ===
- Iraqi Airways, which has not flown since the Gulf War earlier in the year, attempts to resume service. The United Nations grants it permission to operate a domestic service only, and only using helicopters.
- May 3 – After merging with Universair, Alisarda is renamed Meridiana.
- May 24–25 – Over a 36-hour period, Israel conducts Operation Solomon, a secret operation to airlift almost the entire Jewish population of Ethiopia 1,500 miles (2,415 km) to Israel. The operation involves 35 aircraft – Israeli Air Force C-130 Hercules, El Al airliners, and a single Ethiopian airliner – making 40 flights, with 28 aircraft in the air simultaneously at one point overnight. Five babies are born aboard the planes during the flights. On May 24, an El Al Boeing 747 cargo plane participating in the operation sets the record for the largest number of people transported in one flight by any single aircraft of any type in history, carrying 1,087 people; three babies are born aboard the 747 during the flight.
- May 26 – Minutes after takeoff from Don Mueang International Airport in Bangkok, Thailand, a thrust reverser deploys in flight aboard Lauda Air Flight 004, the Boeing 767-3Z9ER Mozart, causing it to stall, dive, and disintegrate at 4,000 feet (1,219 m). Its wreckage falls over a wide area in what is now Phu Toei National Park in Uthai Thani province, Thailand. All 223 people on board die.

=== June ===
- June 14 – Julie Ann Gibson becomes the first woman to qualify as a pilot with the Royal Air Force.
- June 17 – Alaska Airlines commences services to the Soviet Union.

=== July ===
- July 1 – Trans World Airlines chairman Carl Icahn sells the airline's route authorities to London from Boston, Chicago, Los Angeles, and New York City to American Airlines for $445 million.
- July 8 – A U.S. Navy F/A-18 Hornet fighter is forced to shoot down an E-2 Hawkeye airborne early warning aircraft after its crew abandons it following an engine fire.
- July 10 – Attempting an instrument approach to Birmingham Municipal Airport (now Birmingham-Shuttlesworth International Airport) in severe thunderstorms, L'Express Airlines Flight 508, a Beechcraft C99, crashes in the Ensley neighborhood of Birmingham, Alabama, killing 13 of the 15 people on board and injuring the two survivors and four people on the ground. It remains the deadliest aviation accident in Alabama's history.
- July 11 – An under-inflated tire overheats and starts a fire on board Nigeria Airways Flight 2120, a McDonnell Douglas DC-8-61, shortly after takeoff from King Abdulaziz International Airport in Jeddah, Saudi Arabia. The flight crew attempts to return to the airport, but the airliner crashes short of the runway, killing all 261 people on board. It remains the deadliest accident involving a DC-8.
- July 17 – Arthur Raymond Brooks, age 95, dies at his home in Summit, New Jersey. He had been the last surviving American World War I flying ace to have served in a U.S. squadron.
- July 24 – Operation Provide Comfort in northern Iraq ends and is succeeded immediately by Operation Provide Comfort II, a more straightforwardly military operation to prevent Iraqi forces from attacking Iraqi Kurds. It includes a no-fly zone for Iraqi military aircraft over Iraq north of the 36th parallel enforced by American, British, and French aircraft.
- July 31 – American race car driver Al Loquasto and his passenger are killed when the wings of a Piper PA-28-236 Cherokee he is piloting separate from its fuselage in flight in a violent thunderstorm and it crashes.

=== August ===
- During the month, the Bird Strike Committee USA, a volunteer group including representatives from the United States Department of Defense, the Federal Aviation Administration, the United States Department of Agriculture, the aviation industry, and airports, is formed to promote the collection of data on bird strikes and other collisions between wildlife and aircraft, facilitate exchange of the data, and champion the development of systems to reduce the hazard of such collisions.
- August 16 – Indian Airlines Flight 257, a Boeing 737-2A8, crashes on descent into Imphal, India, killing all 69 people on board.

=== September ===
- September 8–12 – The 35th Annual Tailhook Association Symposium – an annual gathering of U.S. naval aviators – takes place at the Las Vegas Hilton in Las Vegas, Nevada. During the symposium, over 100 U.S. Navy and U.S. Marine Corps officers are alleged to have sexually assaulted 83 women and seven men in what becomes known as the Tailhook scandal. Resulting investigations conducted by the Department of the Navy, the Inspector General of the Department of Defense, and others lead to the resignation of Secretary of the Navy H. Lawrence Garrett III, the early retirement of Chief of Naval Operations Admiral Frank B. Kelso II, and a total of 14 admirals and almost 300 other officers having their careers ended or damaged. The Department of the Navy severs its ties to the Tailhook Association from October 1991 until January 1999.
- September 11 – Continental Express Flight 2574, an Embraer EMB 120RT Brasilia operated by Britt Airways, crashes near Eagle Lake, Texas, while on approach to George Bush International Airport in Houston, Texas, killing all 14 people on board.
- September 20 – Lithuanian Airlines – the future FlyLAL-Lithuanian Airlines – is founded as the flag carrier of Lithuania.
- September 27 – Trans European Airways goes out of business.

=== October ===
- October 1 – The United States Air Force discontinues the use of tail guns on B-52 Stratofortresses, bringing to an end the use of gunners aboard bombers of the U.S. Air Force and its predecessors dating back to World War I. The move cuts costs, and is prompted by the obsolesence of guns aboard bombers in the face of advances in electronic warfare and air-to-air missile technology. A B-52 based at Loring Air Force Base in Maine had carried a gunner on a flight for the last time in late September.
- October 25 – American impresario and rock concert promoter Bill Graham, another passenger, and the pilot die when their Bell 206B helicopter, off course and flying too low in high winds and rain, strikes a 223-foot (68-meter) transmission tower and explodes west of Vallejo, California. The helicopter's wreckage hangs in the tower for more than a day after the accident.
- October 29 – A Royal Australian Air Force Boeing 707-368C, registration number A20-103, crashes into the Pacific Ocean 43 km (27 mi) south of RAAF Base East Sale, Victoria, Australia, while conducting an asymmetric flight demonstration.

=== November ===
- November 5 – Transaero makes its first passenger flight, a charter flight from Moscow in the Soviet Union's Russian Soviet Federated Socialist Republic to Tel Aviv, Israel.
- November 13 – Midway Airlines ceases flight operations. The bankrupt airline is later liquidated.
- November 20 – An Azerbaijani Mil Mi-8 (NATO reporting name "Hip") helicopter is shot down in Khojavend Rayon, killing all 22 people on board, including government officials from Azerbaijan and observers from Russia and Kazakhstan.

=== December ===
- December 4 – Pan American World Airways, bankrupt since August 11, is finally dissolved after 64 years of operation.
- December 16 – The Estonian Air Force is reestablished.
- December 21 – In response to the outbreak of the Yugoslav Wars, Germany bans all air traffic between itself and the Socialist Federal Republic of Yugoslavia.
- December 26
  - The Soviet Union is dissolved into 15 post-Soviet states, bringing the Cold War to an end.
  - The 12 members of the Commonwealth of Independent States (CIS) – Armenia, Azerbaijan, Belarus, Georgia, Kazakhstan, Kirghizstan, Moldova, Russia, Tajikistan, Turkmenistan, Ukraine, and Uzbekistan– sign the Civil Aviation and Airspace Use Treaty in Minsk, Belarus. The treaty creates the CIS's Interstate Aviation Committee, a supervising body overseeing the use and management of civil aviation in the CIS which also serves as the official civil aviation authority in Russia.
- December 27 – Ice breaks off the wings and is sucked into both engines of Scandinavian Airlines Flight 751, a McDonnell Douglas MD-81 with 129 people on board, causing both engines to shut down just after the aircraft lifts off from Stockholm, Sweden. The plane makes an emergency landing in a field near Gottröra. There are no fatalities, but 92 of the people on board are injured.
- December 29 – China Airlines Flight 358, a Boeing 747-2R7F cargo plane, crashes shortly after takeoff from Chiang Kai-shek International Airport in Taipei, Taiwan, after the number three engine and its pylon break off the right wing and strike the number four engine, breaking it off as well. The entire crew of five dies. The Boeing Company subsequently recalls all Boeing 747s for pylon modifications.

== First flights ==
- Cessna Citation VI

=== January ===
- January 11 - Swift S-1
- January 16 - Terzi T30 Katana

=== February ===
- Cessna Citation VII
- February 13 – Swearingen SJ30
- February 25 - Robin X4

=== March ===
- March 22 - Scaled Composites Pond Racer

=== April ===
- April 4 – Wilson Global Explorer
- April 27 – Eurocopter Tiger
- April 29 – Atlas ACE
- April 29 – Cessna CitationJet/M2

=== May ===
- May 10 – Canadair Regional Jet
- May 15 – Lockheed ES-3A Shadow
- May 31 – Pilatus PC-12

=== June ===
- June 18 – BAe RJ70

=== August ===
- August 9 – Allstar SZD-59
- August 12 – Bell 230

=== September ===
- September 15 – C-17 Globemaster III
- September 25 – BAe Jetstream J41

=== October ===
- October 1 – Reflex Lightning Bug
- October 25 – Airbus A340

=== November ===
- November 22 – Korean Air Chang-Gong 91
- November 36 – Grob GF 200

=== December ===
- December 6 – Dornier 328
- December 6 – DG Flugzeugbau DG-800
- December 23 – Kaman K-MAX

== Retirements ==
- Avro Shackleton by the Royal Air Force
- Westland 30

== Deadliest crash ==
The deadliest crash of this year was Nigeria Airways Flight 2120, a McDonnell Douglas DC-8 which crashed near Jeddah, Saudi Arabia on 11 July, killing all 261 people on board.
