= Cityhopper =

Cityhopper may refer to:

- CityHopper, ferry service in Brisbane, Australia
- KLM Cityhopper, Dutch airline
- NLM CityHopper, former Dutch airline that merged with NetherLines to form KLM Cityhopper
