= NLM CityHopper Flight 431 =

1981 aviation accident

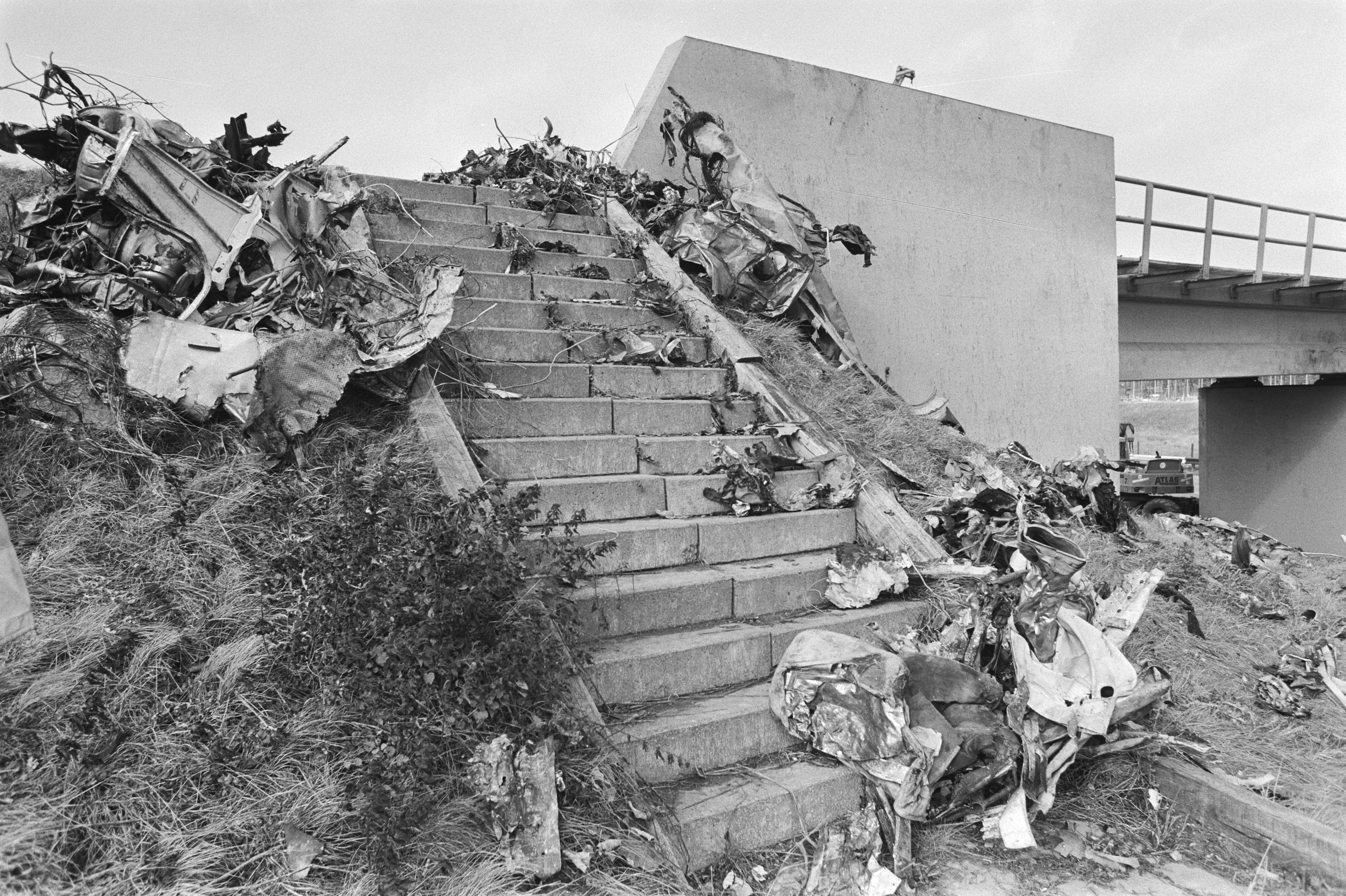
- The crash site of NLM Flight 431

Accident
- Date: 6 October 1981
- Summary: Structural failure in severe turbulence
- Site: Moerdijk, near Rotterdam Airport, Netherlands; 51°40′49.8″N 4°37′00.2″E

Aircraft
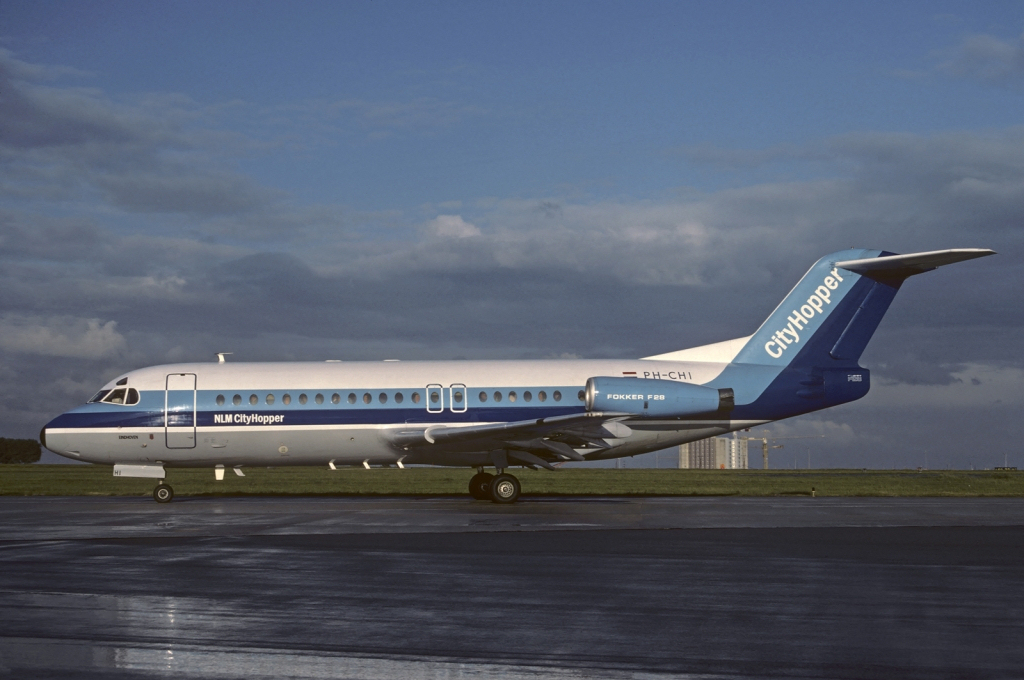
- PH-CHI, the aircraft involved in the accident, is seen here in May 1981
- Aircraft type: Fokker F-28-4000
- Aircraft name: Eindhoven
- Operator: NLM CityHopper
- Registration: PH-CHI
- Flight origin: Rotterdam Airport
- Stopover: Eindhoven Airport
- Destination: Hamburg Airport
- Occupants: 17
- Passengers: 13
- Crew: 4
- Fatalities: 17
- Survivors: 0

Ground casualties
- Ground fatalities: 1

NLM CityHopper Flight 431 was a flight by a Fokker F-28-4000, registration PH-CHI, that was operating an international scheduled Rotterdam–Eindhoven–Hamburg passenger service. On 6 October 1981, the aircraft encountered a tornado on the first leg, minutes after taking off from Rotterdam Airport, and crashed 15 miles (24 km) south-southeast of Rotterdam. All 17 occupants of the aircraft – 13 passengers and 4 crew members– died in the accident.

== Aircraft and crew ==
Named Eindhoven, the aircraft involved in the accident was a Fokker F28-4000, registration PH-CHI, that was built in 1979 with c/n 11141. At the time of the accident, the airframe had accumulated 4,485 flight hours and 5,997 cabin pressurization cycles.

The captain was 33-year-old Jozef Werner, who had been with NLM CityHopper for nearly 11 years. He had 4,900 flight hours, including 309 hours on the Fokker F28. The first officer was 28-year-old Hendrik Schoorl, who had been with the airline for three years and had 2,971 flight hours, with 2,688 of them on the Fokker F28.

== Description of the accident ==
During the weather briefing 44 minutes before takeoff, the crew was apprised of an area of strong thunderstorms with 3/8 (37.5%) sky coverage of cumulonimbus at a base of 1,200 feet (370 m), south-southwest winds 15 to 25 knots (28 to 46 km/h; 17 to 29 mph) strong, and 5 kilometres (3.1 mi) visibility at Rotterdam Airport (IATA: RTM). The aircraft took off at 17:04 CET (UTC +1) from RTM. The crew noted heavy rain in thunderstorms on the airplane's weather avoidance radar at 17:09, receiving clearance to avoid the area. At 17:12 the aircraft entered a tornado while flying through clouds. The weather system the aircraft entered into was apparently the same "tornado-like" system that Zeeland locals described as being responsible for considerable property damage. Meteorologically, these vortices are indeed tornadoes, and the disintegrating airliner was seen exiting cloud cover. A police officer first photographed the tornado, then smoke from the burning plane a few minutes later. An investigation concluded that a sharp increase in altitude registered on the altimeter was not a change in altitude, rather a pressure drop associated with the tornado.

Stresses experienced by the airframe owing to severe turbulence resulted in loads of +6.8 g and −3.2 g ripping the starboard wing off. The aircraft was designed for a maximum G-load of up to 4 g. The aircraft spun down into the ground from 3,000 ft (910 m), crashing some 400 m (1,300 ft) from a Shell chemical plant on the southeastern outskirts of Moerdijk. All 17 occupants of the aircraft perished in the accident. While observing the unfolding incident from the ground, a firefighter suffered a fatal cardiac arrest.

== See also ==
- List of accidents and incidents involving commercial aircraft
