= Terzi T30 Katana =

Italian aerobatic monoplane built by Terzi Aerodyne

T30 Katana

General information
- Type: Single-seat aerobatic monoplane
- National origin: Italy
- Manufacturer: Terzi Aerodyne
- Designer: Pietro Terzi

History
- First flight: 16 January 1991

The Terzi T30 Katana is an Italian single-seat competition aerobatic monoplane designed by the Milanese aeronautical engineer Pietro Terzi. Terzi built a limited series with his firm Terzi Aerodyne based in Milan, Italy.

== Design and development ==
The Katana is a single-seat monoplane with a fixed conventional landing gear. The wings and tail are aluminum alloy construction with a steel tube fuselage covered with composite shells. It is powered by either a nose-mounted Lycoming IO-720 or Lycoming IO-540 piston engine.

== Variant ==
T30C
Powered by a 300hp (224kW) Lycoming IO-540 piston engine.
T30E
Powered by a 400hp (298kW) Lycoming IO-720 piston engine.

== Specifications (T30E) ==
Data from

General characteristics

- Crew: 1
- Length: 6.7 m (22 ft 0 in)
- Wingspan: 7.77 m (25 ft 6 in)
- Empty weight: 658 kg (1,451 lb)
- Max takeoff weight: 880 kg (1,940 lb)
- Powerplant: 1 × Lycoming IO-720 piston, 300 kW (400 hp)

Performance

- Maximum speed: 506 km/h (314 mph, 273 kn)
- Cruise speed: 359 km/h (223 mph, 194 kn)
- Stall speed: 98 km/h (61 mph, 53 kn)
- Range: 402 km (250 mi, 217 nmi)
- Rate of climb: 23 m/s (4,500 ft/min)
