= NetherLines =

Dutch commuter airline

IATA	ICAO	Call sign
WU	NET	NETHERLINES
- Founded: 1984
- Ceased operations: 31 March 1991, merged with NLM CityHopper to form KLM Cityhopper
- Hubs: Amsterdam Airport Schiphol
- Destinations: 13
- Parent company: KLM
- Headquarters: Amsterdam Airport Schiphol, Netherlands

NetherLines B.V. was a commuter airline that was a subsidiary of Nedlloyd. It merged with NLM CityHopper in 1991 to form KLM Cityhopper.

== Company history ==
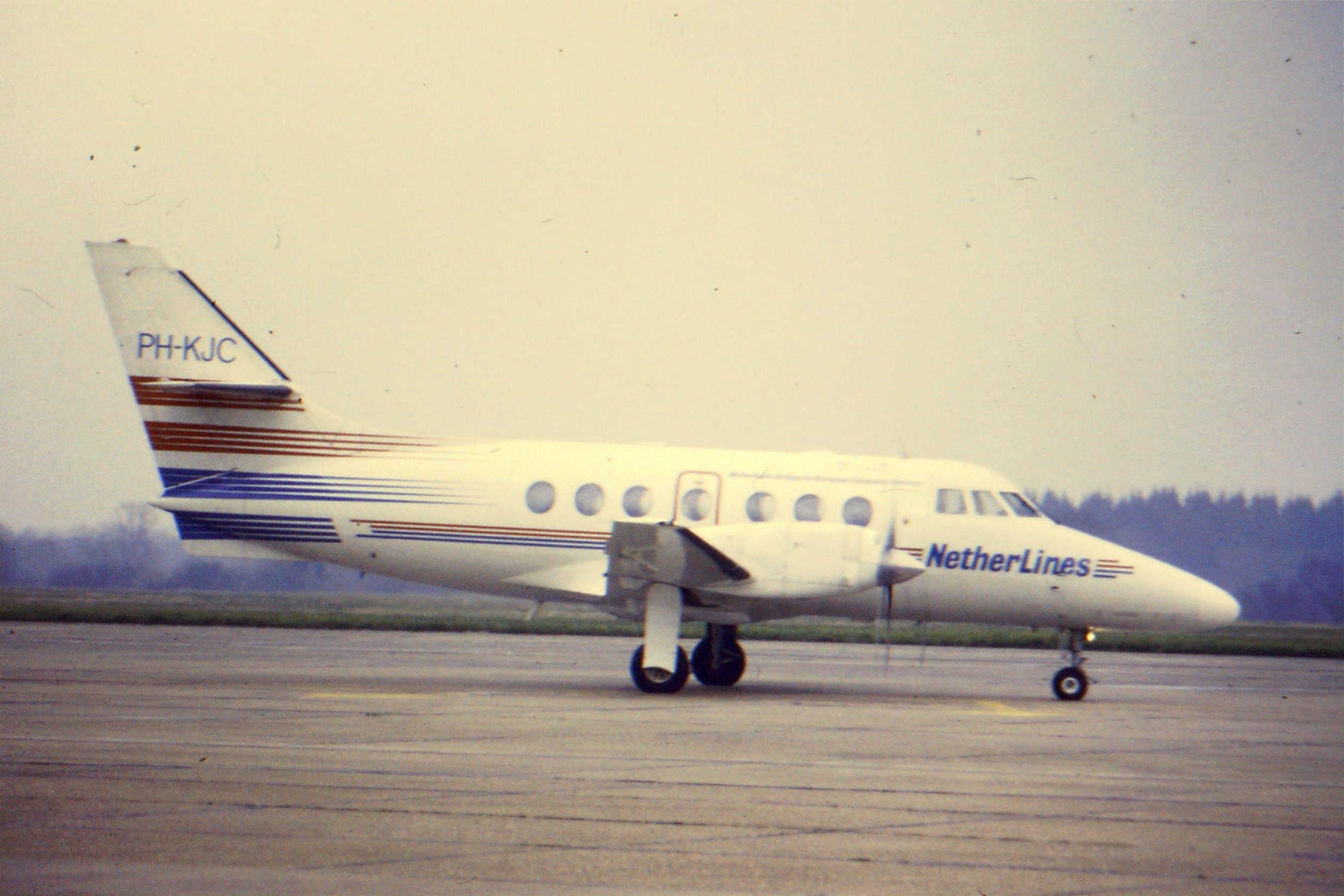
Jetstream 31

Netherlines was founded in April 1984 under the full name of Netherlines Airlines For European Commuter Services BV and began services using Jetstream 31 aircraft on a route between Amsterdam and Luxembourg. Other destinations served throughout the years were Eindhoven, Enschede, Rotterdam, Groningen, Cologne, Münster, Lille, Birmingham, East Midlands, Luton and Southampton.

Netherlines also used the Saab 340 to open a route to Vienna.

KLM acquired Netherlines in April 1988; the combined Netherlines-NLM CityHopper operation was NLM CityHopper/Netherlines, and it had its head office at Amsterdam Airport Schiphol.

The operations of Netherlines were merged with NLM CityHopper, and the combined company became KLM Cityhopper on 1 April 1991.

== Fleet details ==
- 6 Jetstream 31
- 3 Saab 340
