= NLM CityHopper =

Dutch commuter airline

IATA	ICAO	Call sign
HN	NLM	CITY
- Founded: 1966
- Commenced operations: 29 August 1966
- Ceased operations: 31 March 1991 (rebranded as KLM Cityhopper)
- Hubs: Amsterdam Airport Schiphol
- Parent company: KLM (100%)
- Headquarters: Amsterdam Airport, Haarlemmermeer, Netherlands

NLM CityHopper was a Dutch commuter airline, founded in 1966. Its head office was in Building 70 in Schiphol Airport East in Haarlemmermeer, Netherlands.

== History ==
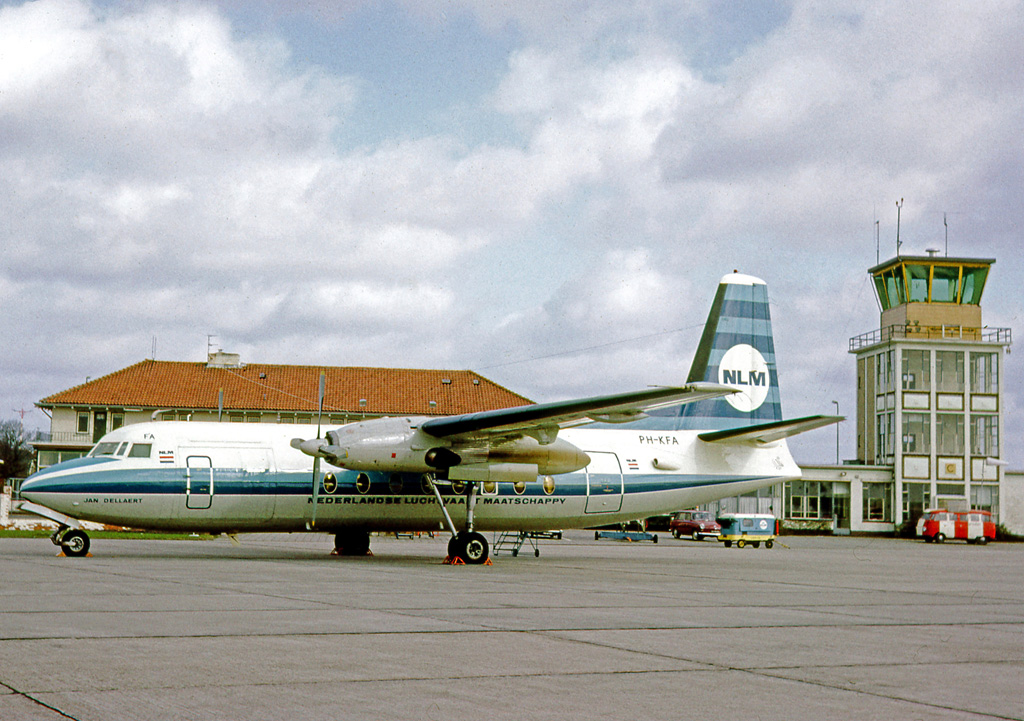
NLM Fokker F.27 Friendship wearing the initial titles without CityHopper at Groningen in 1967

The carrier was formed as NLM Nederlandse Luchtvaart Maatschappij in 1966. Starting operations on 29 August 1966 using leased Fokker F27 aircraft from the Royal Dutch Air Force, it was set up as a KLM subsidiary under a two-year contract to operate domestic services within the Netherlands. The airline saw the incorporation of the Fokker F28 in 1978. Amsterdam, Eindhoven, Enschede, Groningen, Maastricht, and Rotterdam comprised the airline's network at the beginning. The Eindhoven–Hamburg route was the first international service flown by the airline; it was initially aimed at providing a scheduled executive service for Philips, and was made public in April 1974. London-Gatwick was added to the network in early 1975.

The airline changed its name to NLM CityHopper, following the acquisition of Netherlines by its parent company KLM in April 1988; operations of both subsidiaries were subsequently merged. Despite sharing their operational structure, both companies were separate entities until 1 April 1991, when they were absorbed into the newly created KLM Cityhopper.

== Destinations ==
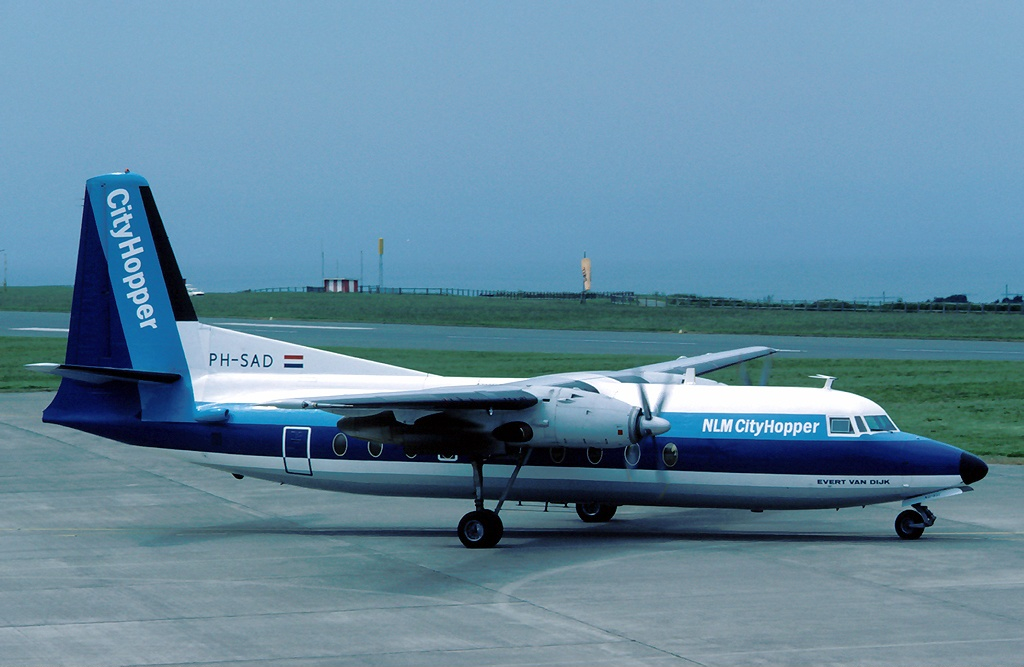
An NLM CityHopper Fokker F-27-200 at Jersey Airport (1983)

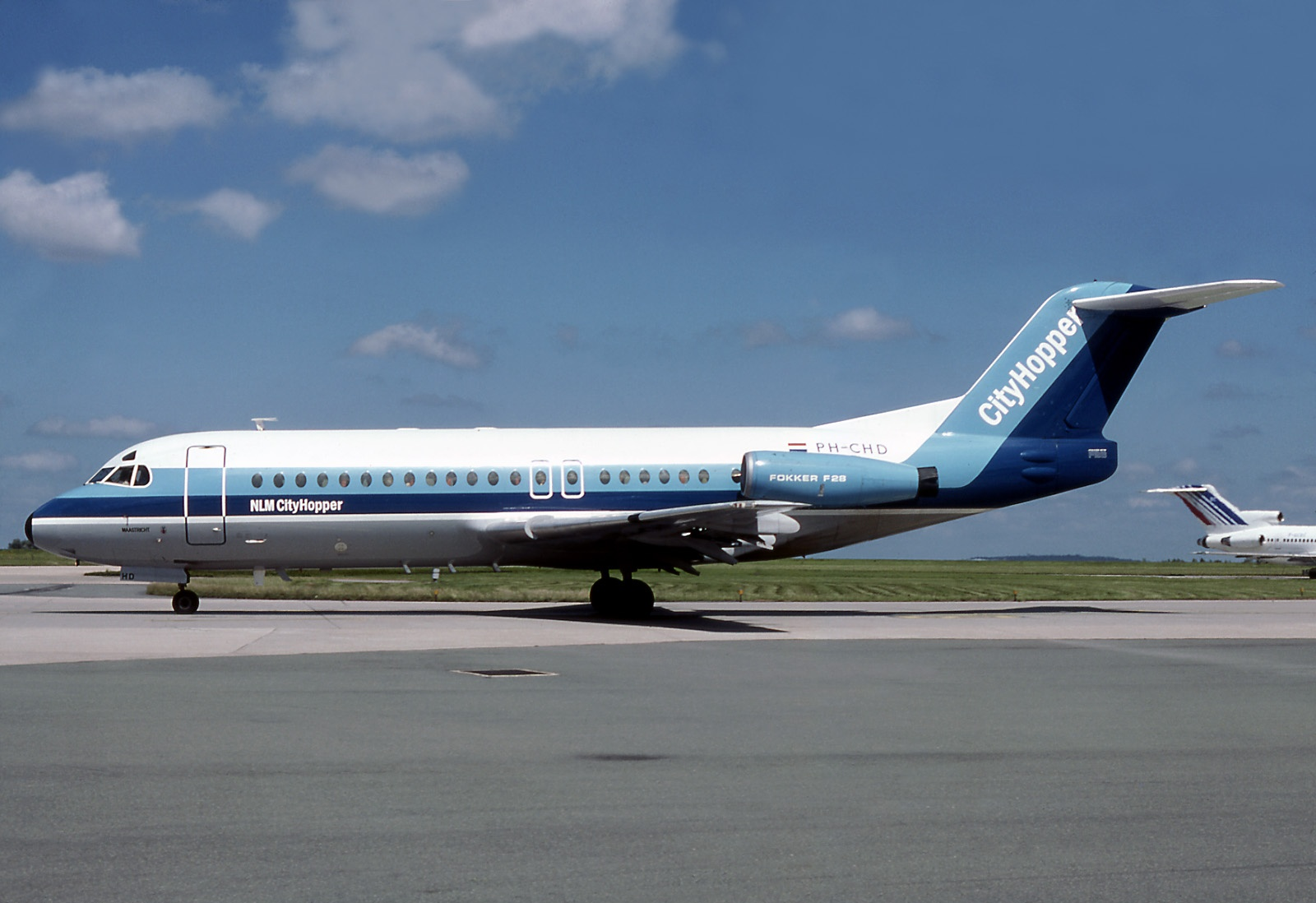
An NLM CityHopper Fokker F-28-4000 at Charles de Gaulle Airport (1980)

The airline served the following destinations throughout its history:

City	Airport code		Airport name	Refs
City	IATA	ICAO	Airport name	Refs
Belgium
Antwerp	ANR	EBAW	Antwerp International Airport	
Brussels	BRU	EBBR	Brussels Airport	
France
Paris	CDG	LFPG	Charles de Gaulle Airport	
Strasbourg	SXB	LFST	Strasbourg Airport	
Germany
Bremen	BRE	EDDW	Bremen Airport	
Düsseldorf	DUS	EDDL	Düsseldorf Airport	
Hannover	HAJ	EDDV	Hannover-Langenhagen Airport	
Stuttgart	STR	EDDS	Stuttgart Airport	
Guernsey
Guernsey	GCI	EGJB	Guernsey Airport	
Jersey
Jersey	JER	EGJJ	Jersey Airport	
Luxembourg
Luxembourg	LUX	ELLX	Findel Airport	
Netherlands
Amsterdam	AMS	EHAM	Schiphol Airport	
Eindhoven	EIN	EHEH	Eindhoven Airport	
Enschede	ENS	EHTW	Enschede Airport Twente	
Groningen	GRQ	EHGG	Groningen Airport Eelde	
Maastricht	MST	EHBK	Maastricht Aachen Airport	
Rotterdam	RTM	EHRD	Rotterdam The Hague Airport	
Sweden
Malmö	MMX	ESMS	Malmö Airport	
United Kingdom
Birmingham	BHX	EGBB	Birmingham Airport	
Bristol	BRS	EGGD	Bristol Airport	
Cardiff	CWL	EGFF	Cardiff Airport	
East Midlands	EMA	EGNX	East Midlands Airport	
London	LGW	EGKK	Gatwick Airport	
London	LHR	EGLL	Heathrow Airport	
London	LTN	EGGW	Luton Airport	
Southampton	SOU	EGHI	Southampton Airport	

== Fleet ==
NLM CityHopper fleet

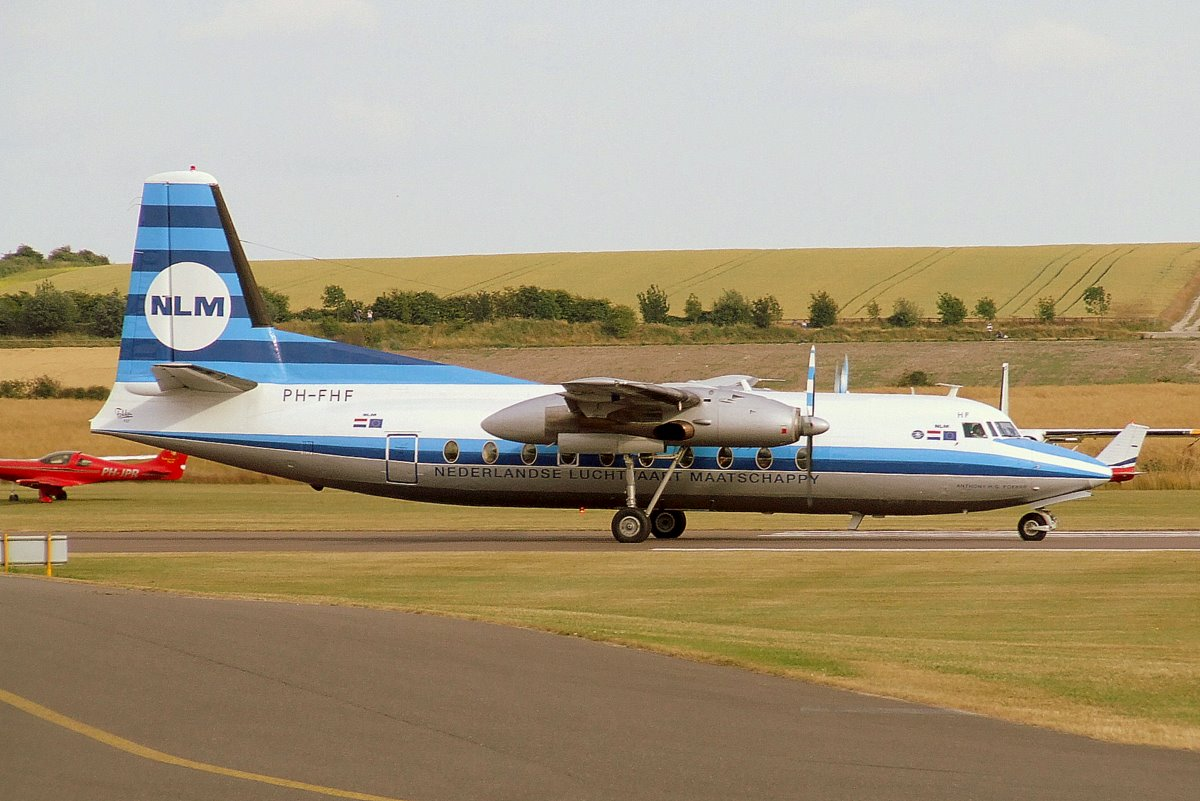
A preserved Fokker F27 in the initial colour scheme of NLM

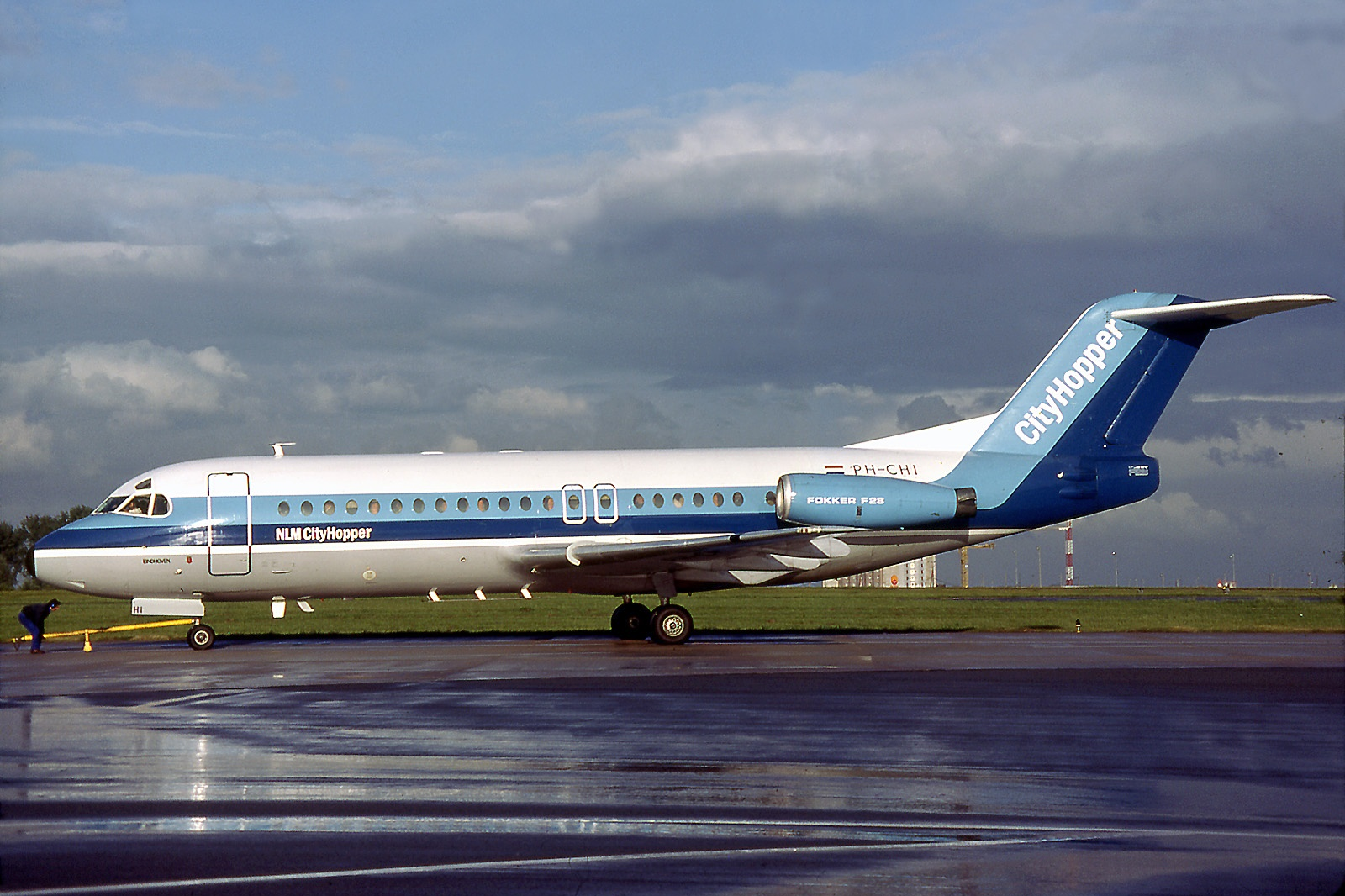
A Fokker F-28-4000 at Charles de Gaulle Airport. This particular aircraft crashed on 6 October 1981 because of bad weather.

Following is a list of aircraft flown by the airline throughout its history.

- Fokker F-27-200
- Fokker F-27-300
- Fokker F-27-400
- Fokker F-27-500
- Fokker F-28-3000
- Fokker F-28-4000
- Jetstream 31
- Saab 340

== Accidents and incidents ==
According to Aviation Safety Network, NLM CityHopper records a single accident/incident event.

- 6 October 1981: A Fokker F-28-4000, registration PH-CHI, that was operating the first leg of an international scheduled Rotterdam–Eindhoven–Hamburg passenger service as NLM CityHopper Flight 431, entered a tornado that caused the starboard wing to separate from the fuselage. The aircraft dived into the ground from 3,000 ft (910 m) and crashed near Moerdijk, killing all 17 people aboard.

== See also ==
- Transport in the Netherlands
