= KLM Cityhopper =

Regional airline of the Netherlands

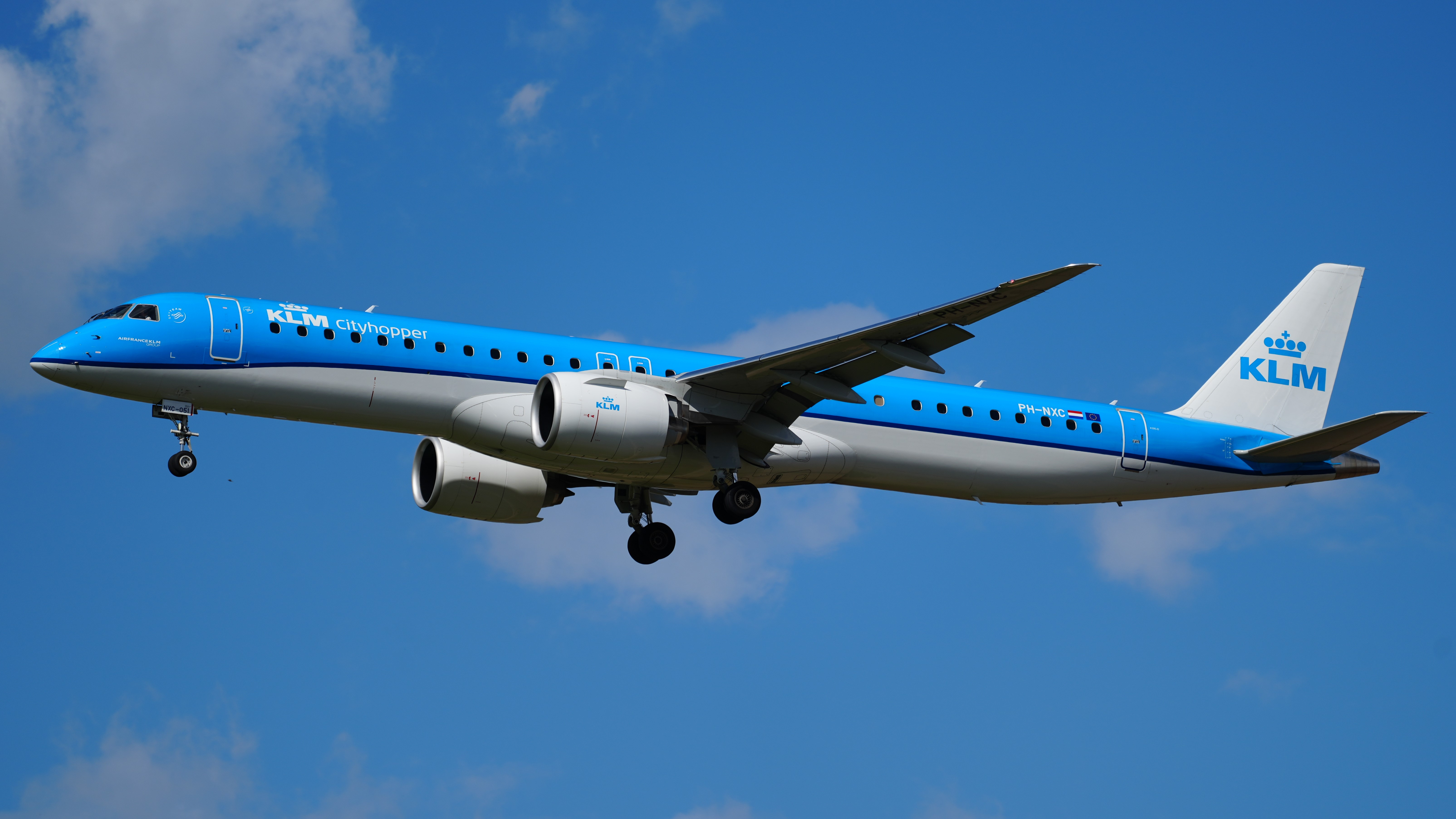
- An Embraer E195-E2 of KLM Cityhopper
IATA	ICAO	Call sign
WA (Note: Although KLM Cityhopper has their own IATA code, ICAO code and callsign, all flights operate with KLM designations (IATA: KL, ICAO: KLM, Callsign: KLM).)	KLC	CITY
- Founded: 1 April 1991; 35 years ago
- Hubs: Amsterdam Airport Schiphol
- Frequent-flyer program: Flying Blue
- Alliance: SkyTeam (affiliate)
- Fleet size: 58
- Destinations: 69
- Parent company: KLM
- Headquarters: Haarlemmermeer, North Holland, Netherlands
- Website: www.klm.com

KLM Cityhopper is the regional airline subsidiary of KLM, headquartered in Haarlemmermeer, North Holland, Netherlands. It is based at nearby Amsterdam Airport Schiphol. As a subsidiary of Air France-KLM, it is an affiliate of SkyTeam. The airline operates scheduled European feeder services on behalf of KLM.

== History ==
The airline was established on 1 April 1991; it started operations the same year. It was formed from the merger of NLM CityHopper and NetherLines. Following the 1991 merger, KLM Cityhopper had Europe's largest fleet composition of Fokker-built aircraft: the Fokker 50, 70 and 100.

In 1998, KLM acquired AirUK, which was rebranded to KLM UK.

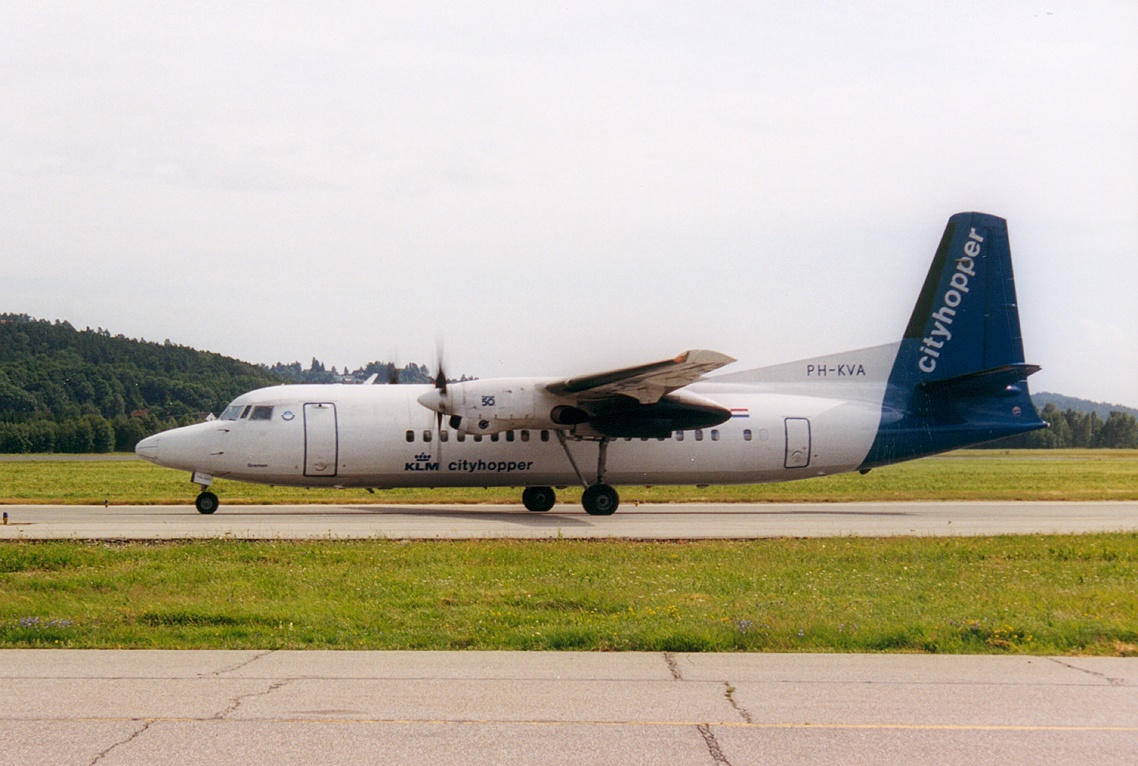
KLM Cityhopper Fokker 50 at Kristiansand Airport, Kjevik painted in the old livery

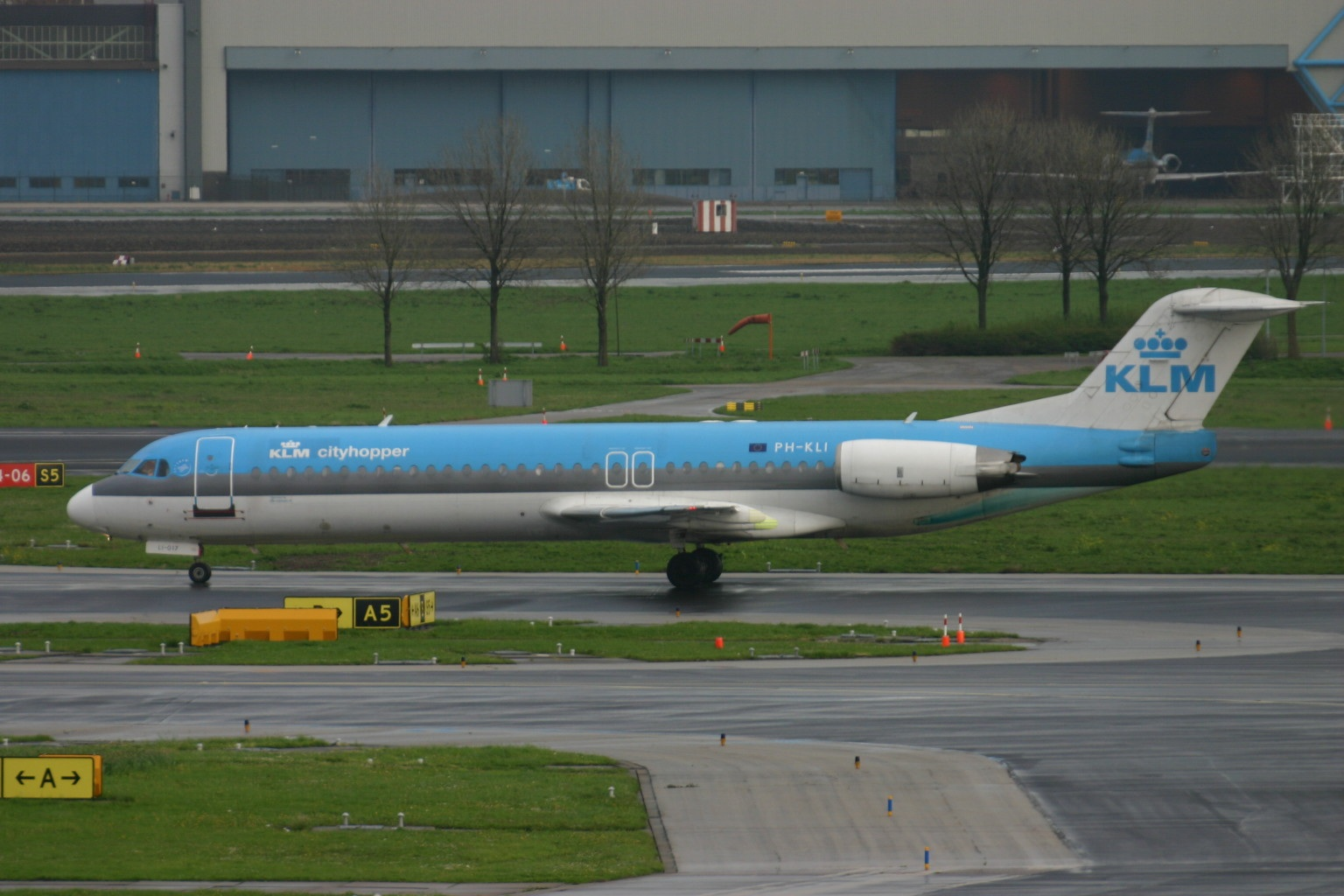
KLM Cityhopper Fokker 100 in the old livery

In November 2002, KLM merged its regional subsidiaries under the KLM Cityhopper name. It had 910 employees as of March 2007.

In 2008, the airline announced its fleet renewal programme, starting with an order of up to 17 Embraer 190 aircraft to replace its ageing and inefficient Fokker 50 aircraft and older Fokker 100 jets. Five Fokker 70 jets would also transfer over from Air France subsidiary Régional. Deliveries of the Embraer E-Jet aircraft began in 2009, and by March 2010, KLM Cityhopper had operated its last Fokker 50 flight. The carrier began to phase out its older Fokker 100 jets. Further Embraer jet orders came in 2012 and allowed KLM Cityhopper to remove the last five remaining Fokker 100 aircraft from its operation.

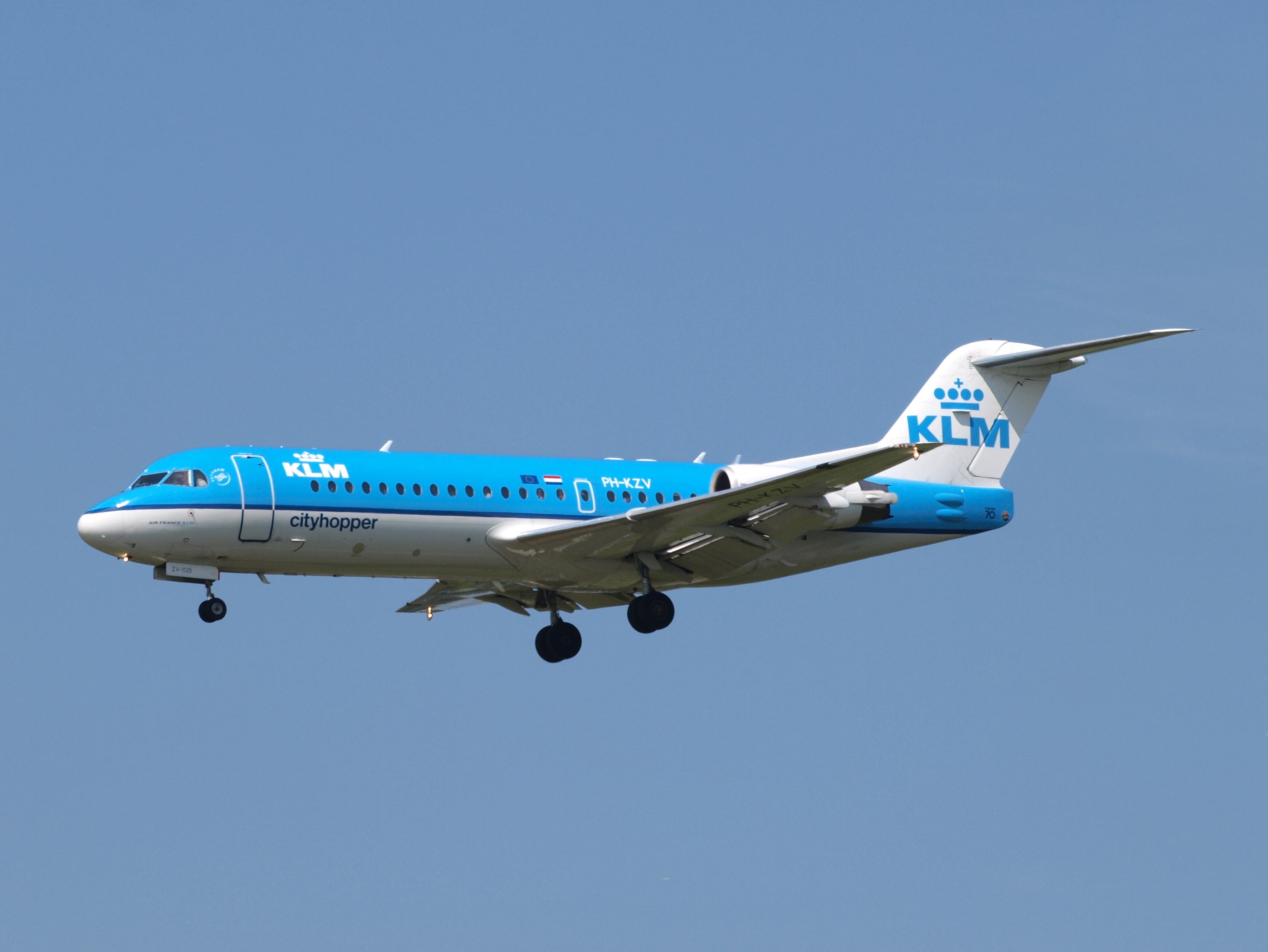
KLM Cityhopper Fokker 70 in the livery replaced in 2014

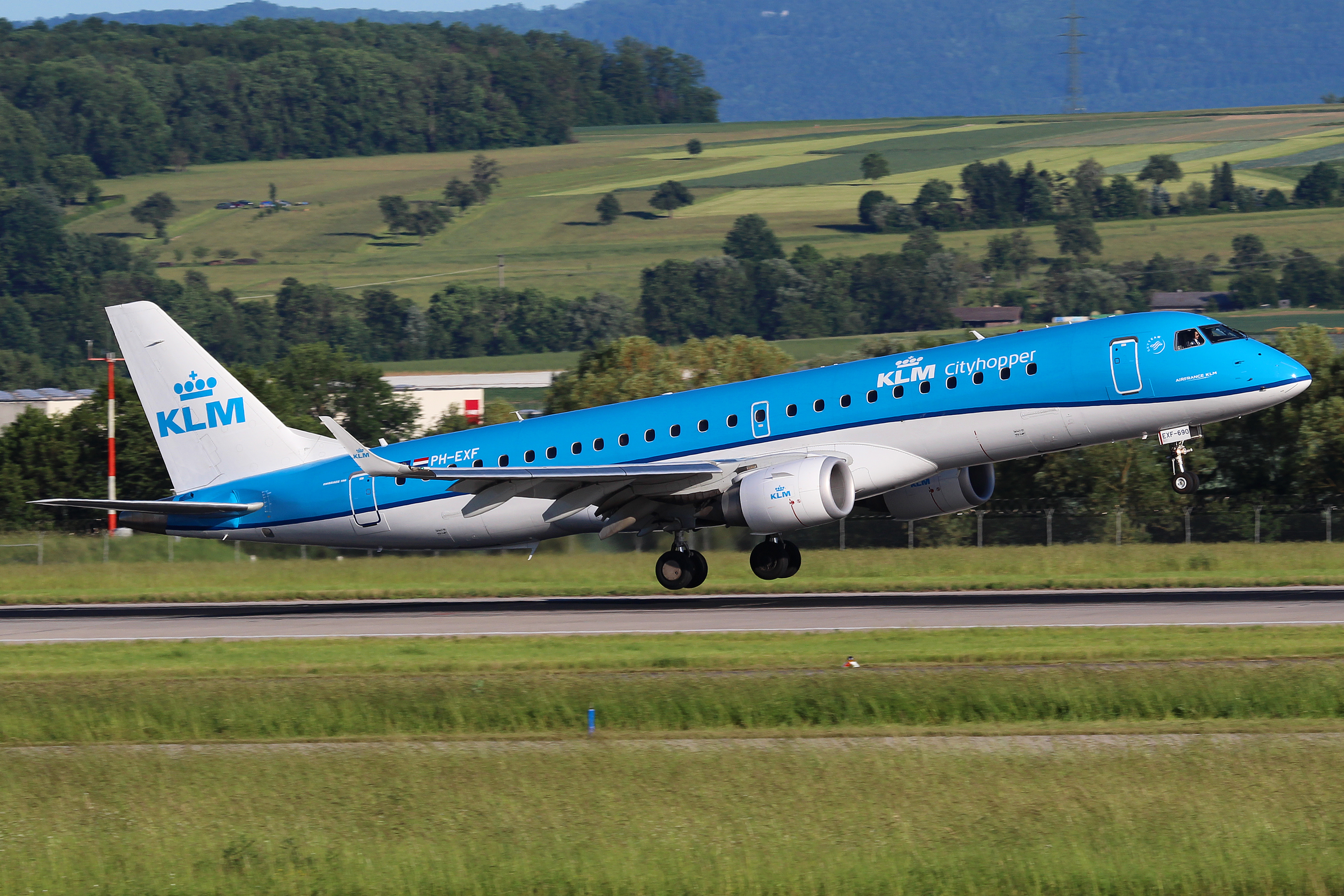
KLM Cityhopper Embraer 190 in the post-2014 livery – note the downsweep of the cheatline.

In October 2012, KLM reportedly presented a plan to its unions that foresaw splitting the airline into two separate units. According to a report by Dutch newspaper Het Financieele Dagblad, KLM was considering splitting off its European operations that would operate with a lower cost base than today and include its subsidiary KLM Cityhopper. This would effectively mean an intercontinental operation to include only the wide-body fleet of KLM and a European fleet operating the short to medium-haul routes as a separate entity, including the current KLM Boeing 737 fleet and the entire KLM Cityhopper fleet.

The plan proved unpopular with unions and the CEO at the time and was parked. KLM then began the process of streamlining its operation, reducing costs and negotiating increased productivity from staff.

In 2013, KLM Cityhopper installed brand new slim-line leather seats from British company Acro on its Fokker 70 fleet. At the same time, the seat pitch was adjusted on all Fokker & Embraer aircraft to offer a three-tier cabin product with a Business Class, Premium Economy zone & Economy zone. Also announced in 2013 was a lease agreement with BOC to take another six Embraer 190 jets, delivery from the end of the year up to April 2014. In turn, the early retirement of 7 Fokker 70 aircraft was announced. On 30 April 2014, KLM Cityhopper took delivery of its 28th Embraer 190 making it the largest operator of the type in Europe. A brand new livery was also launched on the same day with the aircraft arriving into Amsterdam sporting a new drooped cheat line and revised titles. Fondly referred to as "the smiling Dolphin design", the adapted livery was commissioned to better suit the nose profile of modern aircraft such as the Embraer. The new look was created in-house by KLM designers and would be painted on all KLM Cityhopper aircraft and KLM aircraft in time.

Since 2014, KLM started to add new "niche" short-haul destinations to its network, with the majority served by KLM Cityhopper. The new routes were Bilbao, Turin, Zagreb, Montpellier, Kraków and Belfast. KLM Cityhopper also increased capacity from Bristol and Leeds-Bradford – upgrading the destinations to an Embraer 190 operation instead of the Fokker 70. On 9 December 2015, KLM announced new KLM Cityhopper services to Southampton, Inverness, Dresden and Genoa. The new flights commenced in spring 2016.

In 2015, following a long tendering process with several manufacturers, KLM Cityhopper announced that the Embraer 175 would replace the Fokker 70 fleet. The last Fokker 70 was scheduled to leave on 29 October 2017. The deal with Embraer saw an acceleration of the Fokker 70 withdrawal, starting in December 2015, and the arrival of two more Embraer 190 aircraft, bringing that fleet to 30 in total. 7 Fokker 70s were sold to Air Niugini, with four going to Cypriot carrier Tus Airways and two to Peruvian start-up Wayraperú. On 20 March 2016, the first Embraer 175 was delivered, operating in tandem on Fokker 70 routes and the Embraer 190 network when required. Its dual-type rating and commonality would allow overnight introduction of the Embraer 175 as both flight deck & cabin staff trained on the Embraer 190 will be able to operate on the Embraer 175 after a brief "differences" session.

On 13 January 2016, KLM Cityhopper confirmed two out of 17 options for additional aircraft from Embraer – bringing the order total for the Embraer 175 to 17. The first Embraer 175 was delivered on 20 March 2016. In March 2016, KLM Cityhopper became the largest European operator of the Embraer E-Jet family, with 30 Embraer 190s in service as of December 2015 and an order for 17 Embraer 175 jets. KLM Cityhopper now operates one of the youngest regional jet fleets in the world after the Fokker 70 was retired from operation.

On 23 February 2021, KLM Cityhopper received its first Embraer 195-E2.

== Corporate affairs ==
=== Ownership ===
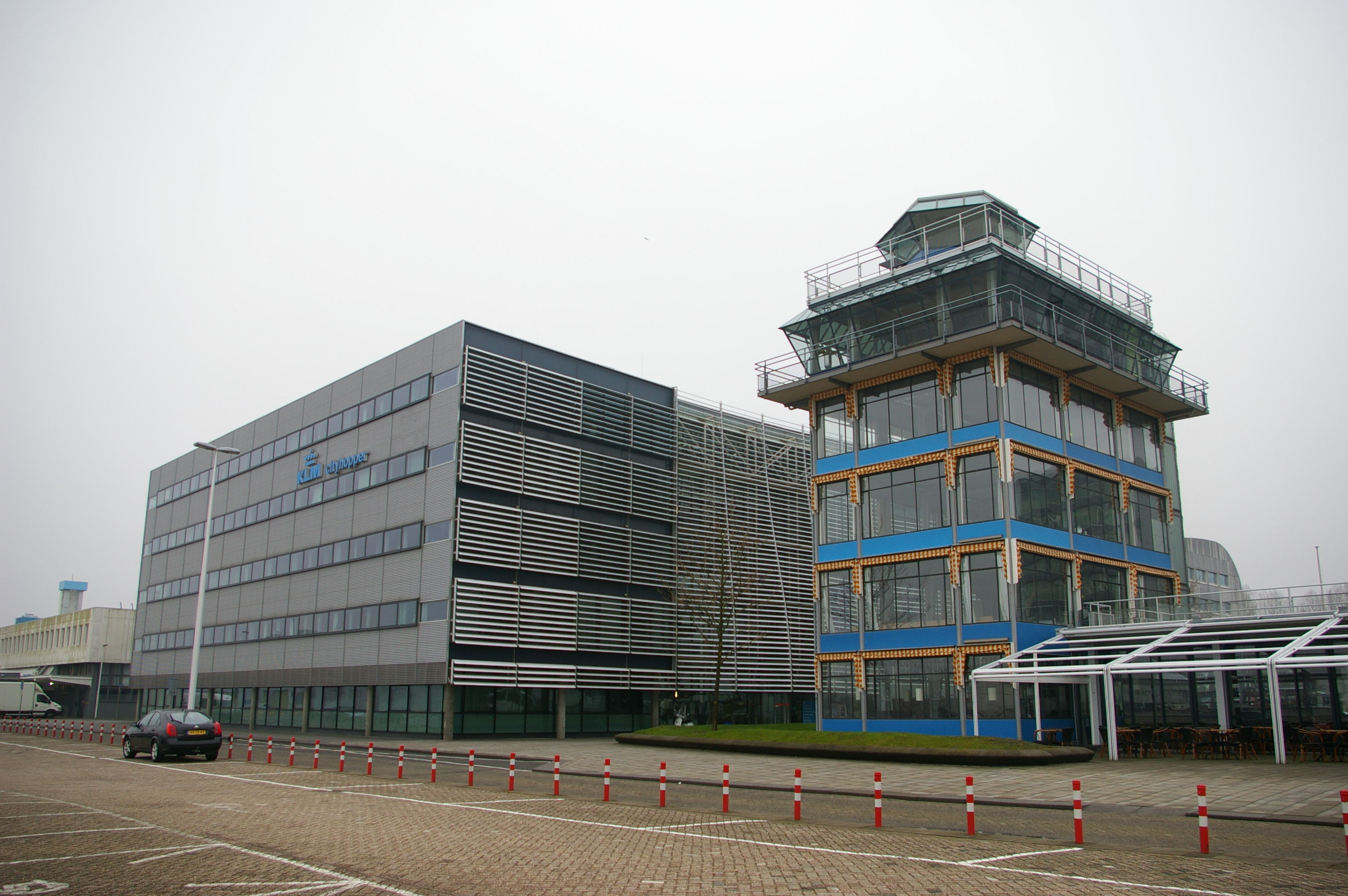
The Convair Building, KLM Cityhopper's head office

KLM Cityhopper is 100% owned by KLM, itself a part of the Air France–KLM Group.

=== Head office ===
KLM Cityhopper's head office is in the Convair Building on the grounds of Amsterdam Airport Schiphol in Schiphol-Oost, Haarlemmermeer. In 1999, Schiphol Real Estate (SRE) contracted out a parcel of land to begin construction of the Convair Building. The building also houses the offices of KLM Recruitment Services. Originally the KLM Cityhopper head office was in the airport's Building 70.

=== Corporate design ===
The company identity is identical to that of its parent carrier with the addition of "Cityhopper" after the KLM crown logo and the absence of "The Flying Dutchman" and "Royal Dutch Airlines" on its aircraft livery. A revised font style was introduced in 2010. In May 2014, KLM Cityhopper also introduced a revised livery.

== Destinations ==
Several of KLM's intra-European routes are operated by both KLM and KLM Cityhopper. Seasonal changes are common with routes switching between the Boeing 737 fleet of KLM to KLM Cityhopper as required, usually in concert with the start/end of IATA timetable seasons. The airline had five fully crewed UK bases in operation, inherited from its purchase of Air UK and subsequent merger of the KLM UK brand. Several hundred British cockpit and cabin crews continued to operate KLM Cityhopper flights from the UK and the Netherlands throughout the carrier's network. All UK bases for cabin crew members were closed in 2017 with the last pilot-only bases closed in May 2020.

== Fleet ==
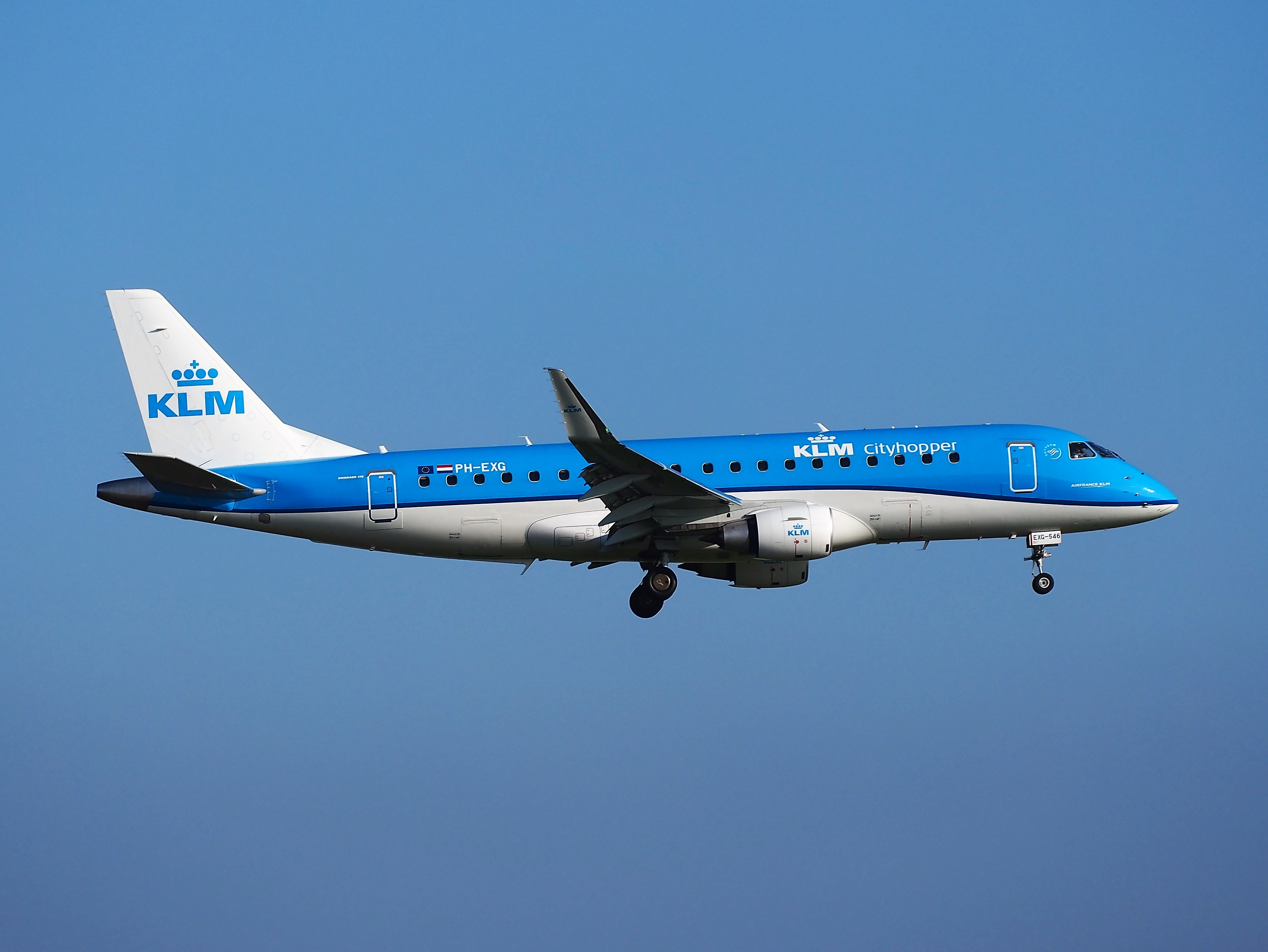
KLM Cityhopper Embraer 175 wearing the latest livery

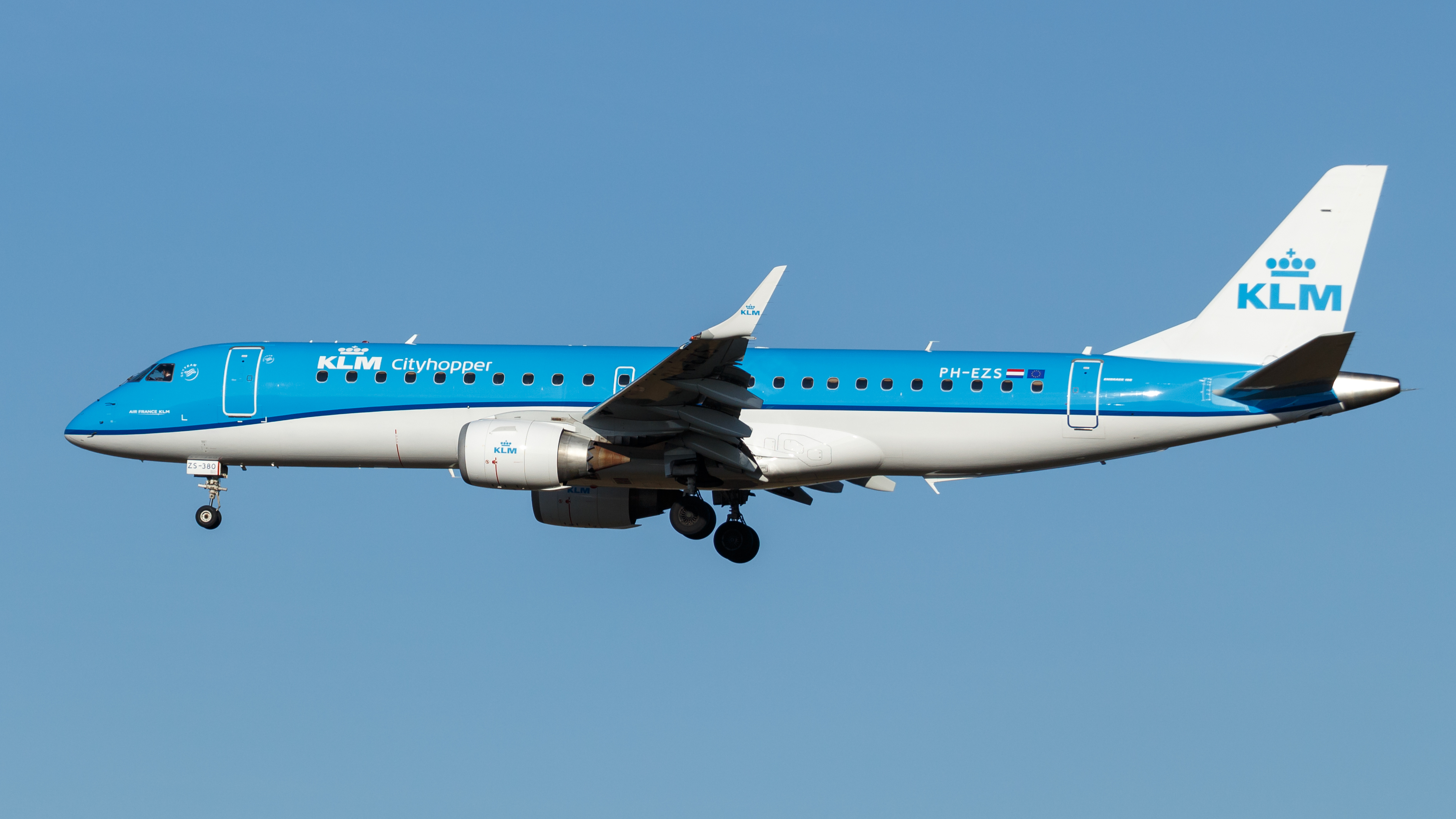
KLM Cityhopper Embraer 190

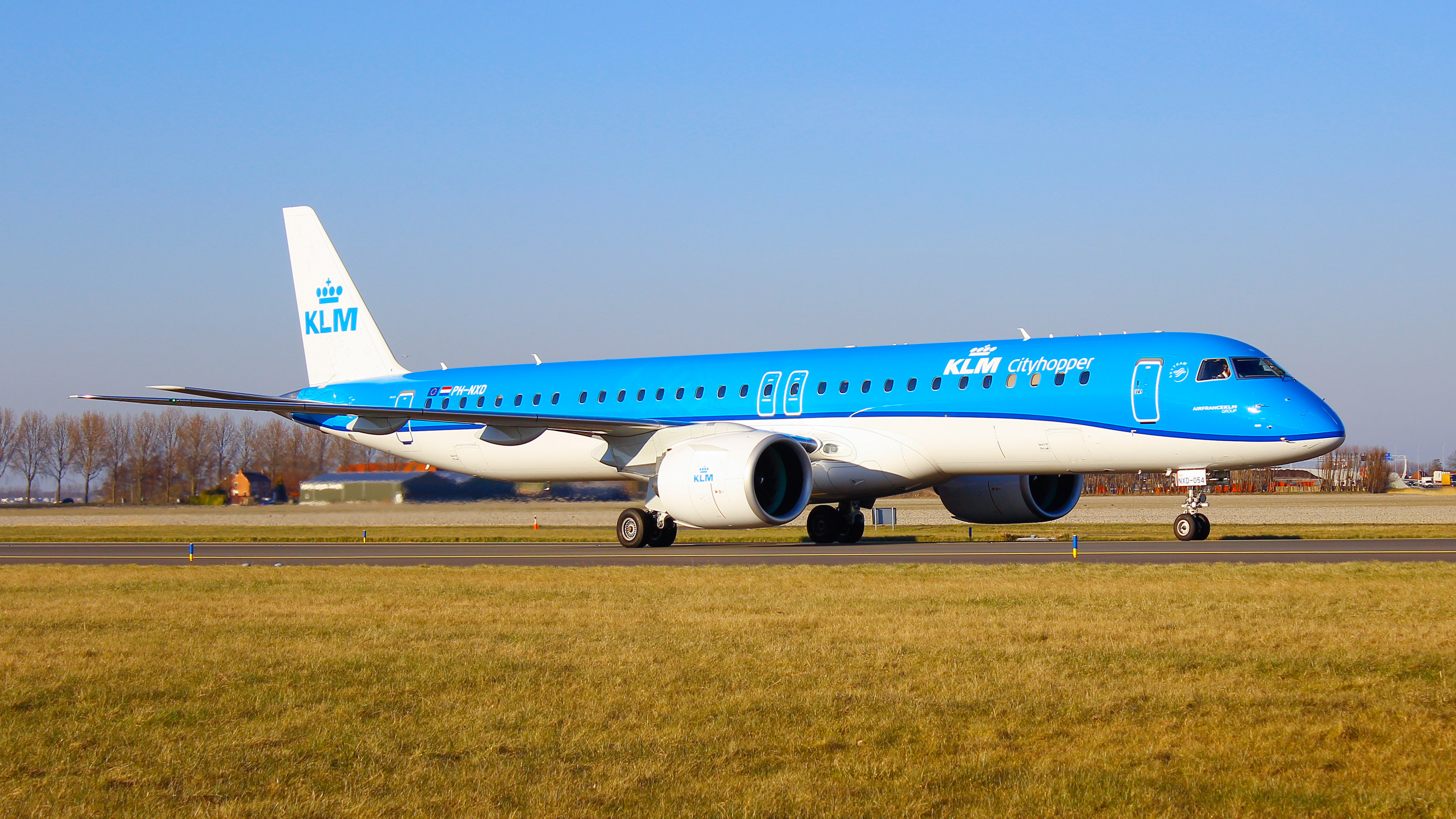
KLM Cityhopper Embraer 195-E2 in 2022

=== Current fleet ===
As of September 2026, KLM Cityhopper operates the following aircraft:

KLM Cityhopper fleet
Aircraft	In service	Orders	Passengers					Notes
Aircraft	In service	Orders	J	Y+	Y	Total	Refs	Notes
Embraer 175	17	—	20	8	60	88		
Embraer 190	16	—	20	8	72	100		
Embraer 195-E2	25	10	20	8	104	132		
Total	58	10						

=== Government aircraft ===
KLM Cityhopper was also responsible for the operation of the state-owned Fokker 70 aircraft, registration PH-KBX. This Fokker was used by the Dutch Government and the royal family and often flown by H. M. King Willem-Alexander himself, but was sold to an Australian-based buyer in 2017. A Boeing 737-700 BBJ Boeing Business Jet, registered PH-GOV, replaced the Fokker 70 and is operated by KLM mainline.

== Services ==
=== In-flight services ===
KLM Cityhopper offers passengers complimentary drinks and refreshments on all scheduled flights. Duty-free/tax-free products are not available. Business Class passengers are offered continental breakfast boxes, sandwiches & dinner salads together with bar service. Economy Class passengers are offered sandwiches or a drink and complimentary snack depending on the time of day and duration of the flight.

In line with its parent carrier, KLM Cityhopper offers a two-class cabin service on all of its scheduled routes. Rows 1 on all aircraft is reserved for Europe Business Class passengers, and the section can be increased to additional rows subject to demand. These classes are defined by the designation "C" - For Europe Business Class and "M" For Europe Economy - in reservation systems.

From 2011, KLM committed to blocking middle seats on its short-haul fleet so that business class passengers would always have an empty seat next to them for extra comfort. This meant that Seats C and E on any business class row on the Fokker fleet were no longer used, and a maximum of three passengers are seated on each row - reducing the maximum capacity of the Fokker 70 on scheduled services to 78 passengers. Seat blocking is not done on the Embraer 190 or E175 fleet which only has four-abreast seating. From 22 April 2013, KLM began charging for hold baggage on all European flights (including all KLM Cityhopper services) unless passengers are on a Business Class ticket or an Elite tier member of the 'Flying Blue' frequent flyer program. The baggage fee will also be waived if the KLM Cityhopper flight is just one leg of an intercontinental trip.

Economy Comfort seats can be purchased on all KLM Cityhopper flights, up to row 7 on the Embraer 190, offering economy passengers additional legroom and the convenience of forward-situated seats for quicker disembarkation. The availability of this section fluctuates depending on the number of Business Class seats sold on the flight.

== Incidents and accidents ==
- On 4 April 1994, a Saab 340 operating KLM Cityhopper Flight 433 crashed at Amsterdam Airport Schiphol, killing three and seriously injuring nine people. A faulty warning light caused the crew to mistakenly believe that the engine suffered from low oil pressure. On final approach at a height of 90 feet (27 m), the captain decided to go around and gave full throttle, however only on the number one engine, leaving the other in-flight idle. Because of this, the aircraft rolled to the right, pitched up, stalled and hit the ground at 80 degrees bank.
- On 29 May 2024, an airport worker died after being ingested into the engine of an Embraer 190 operating KLM Cityhopper Flight 1341. The incident occurred on the apron at Amsterdam Airport Schiphol during pushback as the aircraft was preparing to depart for Billund. Investigators from the Dutch Safety Board determined that the worker intentionally jumped into the running engine to commit suicide.

== Notable pilots ==
In 2017, Willem-Alexander, King of the Netherlands revealed that he had been flying secretly as a copilot twice a month for KLM Cityhopper for the past 21 years, including the state plane.
