= List of schools in the Netherlands =

This is an incomplete list of schools located in the Netherlands.

== Drenthe ==
- Harens Lyceum Zuidlaren, Zuidlaren

== Flevoland ==
- Groenhorst College, Almere/Dronten/Emmeloord/Lelystad
- Oostvaarders College, Almere Buiten

== Gelderland ==
- Baudartius College, Zutphen
- Canisius College, Nijmegen
- Christelijk College Nassau-Veluwe, Harderwijk
- Dorenweerd College, Doorwerth
- Groenhorst College, Barneveld/Ede/Nijkerk/Velp
- Karel de Grote College, Nijmegen
- Notre Dame des Anges, Ubbergen
- Van der Capellen Scholengemeenschap, Elburg

== Groningen ==
=== Groningen ===
- H.N. Werkman College
- Montessori Lyceum Groningen
- Montessori Vaklyceum
- Praedinius Gymnasium
- Willem Lodewijk Gymnasium

=== Haren ===
- Harens Lyceum Kerklaan
- International School Groningen
- Maartenscollege

== Limburg ==
- Bernardinuscollege, Heerlen
- Bouwens van der Boijecollege, Panningen
- Lyceum Schöndeln, Roermond
- Sintermeertencollege, Heerlen

=== Maastricht ===
- International School Maastricht
- Sint-Maartenscollege
- United World College Maastricht

== North Brabant ==
- City Gymnasium, 's-Hertogenbosch
- Gymnasium Beekvliet, Sint-Michielsgestel
- Gymnasium Bernrode, Heeswijk
- International School Eindhoven, Eindhoven
- Markland College, Oudenbosch/Zevenbergen
- Newmancollege, Breda
- Scholengemeenschap Augustinianum, Eindhoven
- Sondervick College, Veldhoven
- Udens College, Uden
- Willem II College, Tilburg

== North Holland ==
- Altra College, Hoofddorp/Krommenie/Purmerend
- Blaise Pascal College, Zaandam
- European School, Bergen, Bergen
- Gemeentelijk Gymnasium, Hilversum
- Hermann Wesselink College, Amstelveen
- International School of Amsterdam, Amstelveen
- International School Hilversum, Hilversum
- Martinus College, Grootebroek
- Mons Aurea, Haarlem
- RSG Enkhuizen, Enkhuizen
- Stedelijk Gymnasium Haarlem, Haarlem

=== Amsterdam ===
- 6th Montessori School Anne Frank
- Albert Einstein International School Amsterdam
- Altra College Amsterdam
- Amsterdam International Community School
- Amsterdams Lyceum
- Barlaeus Gymnasium
- British School of Amsterdam
- Hyperion Lyceum
- Het 4e Gymnasium
- Ignatiusgymnasium
- Japanese School of Amsterdam
- Lycée Vincent van Gogh La Haye-Amsterdam
- Montessori Lyceum Amsterdam
- Pieter Nieuwland College
- Vossius Gymnasium

== Overijssel ==
- Bataafs Lyceum, Hengelo
- International School Twente, Enschede
- Van der Capellen Scholengemeenschap, Dedemsvaart/Wijhe/Zwolle

== South Holland ==
- American School of The Hague, Wassenaar
- Ashram College, Alphen aan den Rijn/Nieuwkoop
- Bonaventuracollege Roelofarendsveen, Roelofarendsveen
- British School in the Netherlands, The Hague/Voorschoten
- Het Rijnlands Lyceum Oegstgeest, Oegstgeest
- ISW Hoogeland, Westland
- Rijnlands Lyceum Sassenheim, Sassenheim
- Schravenlant, Schiedam
- St Stanislas College, Delft/Pijnacker/Rijswijk

=== Leiden ===
- Bonaventuracollege Boerhaavelaan
- Bonaventuracollege Burggravenlaan
- Bonaventuracollege Mariënpoelstraat
- Stedelijk Gymnasium Leiden

=== Rotterdam ===
- Gymnasium Erasmianum
- Japanese School of Rotterdam
- Havo voor Muziek en Dans
- Marnix Gymnasium
- Nord Anglia International School Rotterdam
- Rotterdam International Secondary School

=== The Hague ===
- German International School of The Hague
- Gymnasium Haganum
- Christelijk Gymnasium Sorghvliet
- European School The Hague
- International School of The Hague
- Lycée Vincent van Gogh La Haye-Amsterdam
- Rijnlands Lyceum Wassenaar
- Segbroek College

== Utrecht ==
- Anna van Rijn College, Nieuwegein
- Catholic Comprehensive School, Breul
- Groenhorst College, Bilthoven/Maartensdijk
- Kalsbeek College, Woerden
- Minkema College, Woerden

=== Utrecht ===
- Academie Tien
- Christelijk Gymnasium Utrecht
- Gerrit Rietveld College

== Zeeland ==
- Lodewijk College, Terneuzen
