= Sint-Maartenscollege =

Public high school in Maastricht, Netherlands

- Maastricht, Limburg; Netherlands

Information
- Type: Public
- Established: 1955
- Principal: Currently None
- Enrollment: 1500
- Colors: red and brown
- Accreditation: Stichting Limburgs Voortgezet Onderwijs (Stichting LVO)
- Newspaper: Palet
- Language of instruction: Dutch
- Website: Official Website

The Sint-Maartenscollege (abbreviated as SMC and informally known as SMC) is a state secondary school located in Maastricht, the Netherlands. It operates across two buildings and offers all streams of the Dutch secondary education system, including VMBO, HAVO, and VWO (Atheneum and Gymnasium).

== Name ==
The school is named after Saint Martin of Tours (Dutch: Sint-Maarten), who represents the values of helping and sharing. These values also serve as the school's motto.

== Buildings ==
The Sint-Maartenscollege (SMC) operates out of two buildings. The first, located on Bemelerweg in the Scharn neighborhood, is designated for VMBO classes. The second, situated on Noormannensingel in the Wyck neighborhood, hosts HAVO and VWO classes. A third building was previously in use but has since been sold.

== Classes ==
The school day begins at 08:30 and typically ends between 14:20 and 16:15. The following subjects are taught (though the specific curriculum varies depending on the chosen educational stream):

- English
- Dutch
- German
- French
- Spanish
- Latin (only taught to VWO-Gymnasium)
- Greek (only taught to VWO-Gymnasium)
- Economics
- History
- Geography
- Maths
- Biology
- Chemistry
- Physics
- ICT
- Drawing
- Handicraft
- Life sciences
- NLT (Dutch Wikipedia)
- Music
- ANW (Dutch Wikipedia)
- Philosophy
- Pre-Socratic Philosophy (If chosen by Gymnasium in 5th class)
- Rhetoric (If chosen by Gymnasium in 5th class)
- Drama/Theatre

== Computer lab ==
The school features a room called the "Macademie," equipped with a couple of Mac computers. This room is located within the art department.

== Extracurricular activities ==
SMC offers various extracurricular activities, including a school newspaper and a debate club.

School paper
The school newspaper, Palet, was awarded the title of "Best School Paper of the Netherlands" in both 2002 and 2003. Additionally, it received the "Best School Paper Design" award in 2001 and 2006 during the Dutch National School Paper Day. In 2009, the paper's editors attended this event, where Yvonne Doornduyn, a political journalist and jury member, remarked: "Palet has a good combination of strong layout and quality content."

Palet has approximately 20 editorial members, including three staff members. The editorial team meets at least once a week to discuss layout, design, content, and related topics. The newspaper is published three to five times a year and covers a range of subjects, such as discrimination, politics, and current events, as well as lighter topics like trends, school information, and leisure activities.

SMC Videoclub
SMC also has its own AV Club, which consists of 10 members, including one staff member. The club creates its own scripts and films them professionally using high-quality equipment. They also maintain their own website. However, the club's activities have been suspended due to the COVID-19 pandemic.

Cooking club
Every Monday afternoon, a group of students would gather to cook and eat together, supervised by a staff member. However, this activity has been canceled due to the COVID-19 pandemic.

Debate club
Students have the opportunity to develop their debating skills during Dutch class. The debate club, however, is primarily intended for upper-level students (class 4 and above), who can participate in national debating competitions. Each year, several students compete in these events, with some even winning awards. As of 2012, the debate club is managed by students.

== Notable alumni ==
- Camiel Eurlings, politician and Dutch Minister of Transport, Public Works and Water Management
- Maxime Verhagen, politician and current Dutch Minister of Foreign Affairs
- Boudewijn Zenden, Dutch soccer player
