= Van der Capellen Scholengemeenschap =

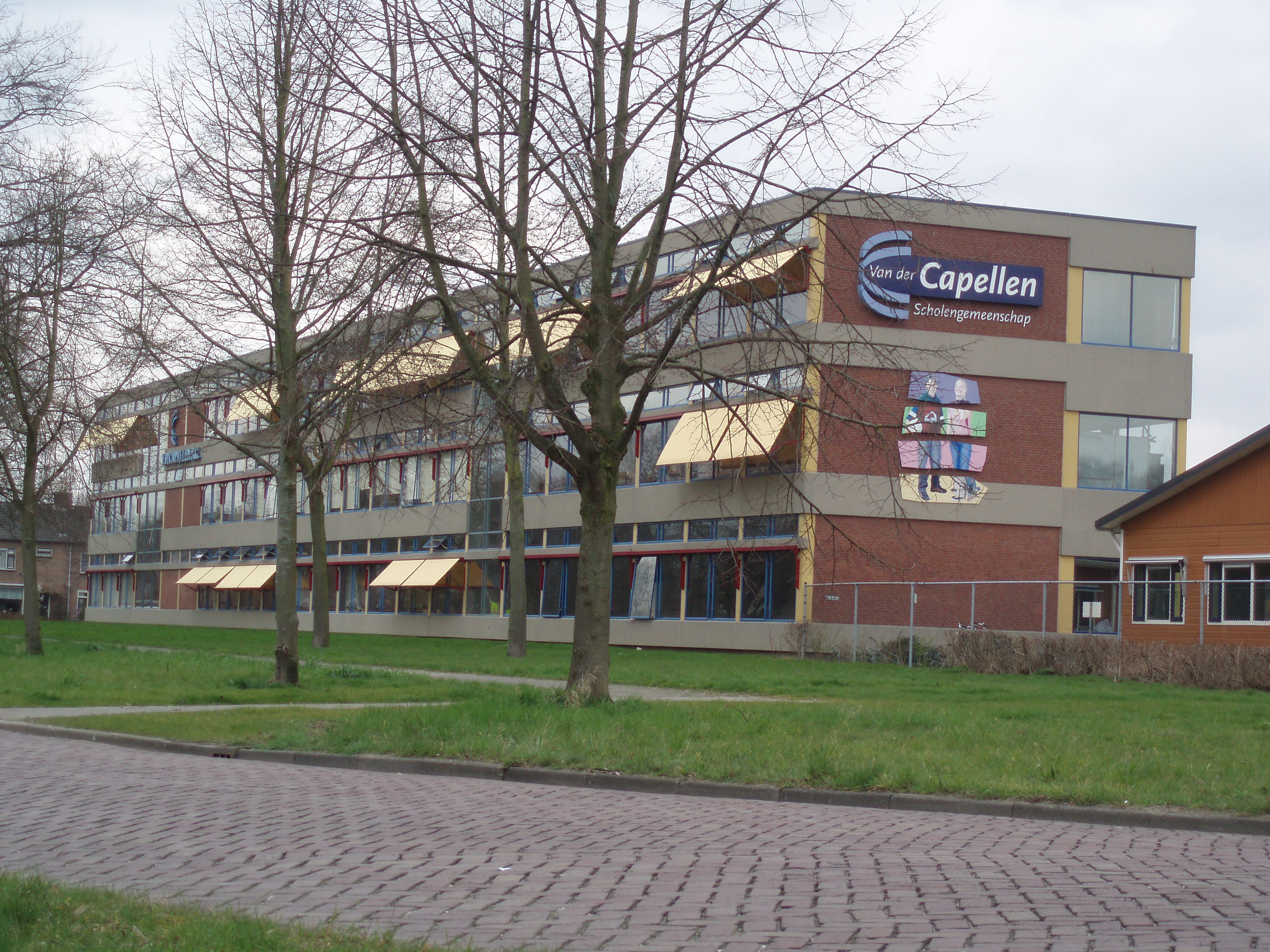
The Van der Capellen Scholengemeenschap in Zwolle.

The Van der Capellen Scholengemeenschap is a Dutch high school, named after the famous Dutch nobleman Joan van der Capellen tot den Pol. It has locations in the Dutch cities and towns of Zwolle, Elburg, Dedemsvaart and Wijhe:

- Location Lassuslaan in Zwolle is the school's main location. It offers VMBO, HAVO and VWO. It was the third school in the Netherlands to offer bilingual VWO (or TVWO) and also offers bilingual HAVO. Students who have completed their education receive an IB Diploma in English at A2 level. Pupils can choose extra subjects such as information technology, dramaturgy and musicology.
- Location Russenweg in Zwolle used to be a location of the school, but is now a joint VMBO school for pupils from all public schools in Rotterdam.
- Location Van Kinsbergen in Elburg burnt down on New Year's night of 2008. It offered VMBO, the first two years of HAVO and VWO.
- Location de Zeven Linden in Dedemsvaart offers VMBO, HAVO and VWO, and allows pupils to choose dramaturgy as extra subjects.
- Locatie Capellenborg in Wijhe offers VMBO, HAVO and VWO. Pupils can choose extra subjects such as musicology, dramaturgy and musical theatre. This school is small, with only 275 pupils.

== See also ==
- Education in the Netherlands
- List of schools in the Netherlands
- Bilingual Education
- IB Diploma Programme
