= RSG Enkhuizen =

School in Enkhuizen, North Holland, Netherlands

Coordinates: 52.7087°N 5.2694°E

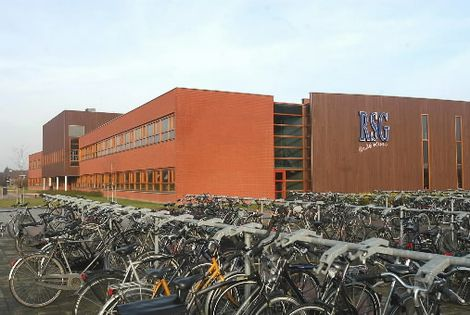
- Modernised school facade (2012)

Location
- Boendersveld 3, 1602 DK; Enkhuizen, North Holland; Netherlands

Information
- Former name: Rijksscholengemeenschap Enkhuizen
- School type: Secondary school
- Motto: School voor je leven (School for life)
- Established: 1 September 1870
- Faculty: 178 (2025)
- Years offered: 4-6 years
- Gender: All
- Enrollment: 1.417 (2024-2025)
- Average class size: 15-30 students
- Language: Dutch, English
- Website: https://rsg-enkhuizen.nl/

RSG Enkhuizen (Regionale Scholengemeenschap Enkhuizen) is a public secondary school in the city of Enkhuizen, located in the Dutch province of North Holland. The school offers education at vmbo-tl, havo, and vwo (atheneum) levels, and has a history dating back to 1870.

== History ==
The origins of RSG Enkhuizen lie in the founding of the Hogere Burgerschool (HBS) on 1 September 1870. This was initiated by progressive local figures, following the introduction of the Dutch Secondary Education Act (Wet op het Middelbaar Onderwijs) by Thorbecke in 1863, which created new educational opportunities. The school opened with 33 students and was housed in the former Zeekantoor, a historic building with various prior uses.

In 1882, the first female students were admitted, following a request by teacher L. Dondorff. The school grew steadily in the early twentieth century. In 1902, a new school building was opened on the Westerstraat. In 1929, the school became a state school, which allowed for a complete five-year program.

During the 1960s and 1970s, several mergers took place. In 1968, the HBS became a branch of the Rijksscholengemeenschap West-Friesland in Hoorn. In 1975, it merged with the municipal mavo to form the Rijksscholengemeenschap Enkhuizen. In 1981, the school moved to a new building at Boendersveld, consolidating its previously scattered locations. At that time, the school also had a full atheneum department.

In 1991, the Dutch central government transferred responsibility for state schools to local municipalities. The school continued under its current name, RSG Enkhuizen.

Since 1999, the school has been managed by an independent foundation with parental representation on the board. In 2025, RSG Enkhuizen celebrates the 50th anniversary of its merge. The school currently has approximately 1,417 students and 178 staff members.

== International projects ==
RSG Enkhuizen actively participates in international partnerships, particularly within the framework of the European Erasmus Programme. In projects with schools from countries including England, Spain, and France, cultural diversity is a central theme. Students take part in exchanges and joint educational activities focused on topics such as respect and inclusion.

The school also offers bilingual education, or TTO, in which students follow certain subjects in English, with the aim of developing international competencies.

== Social engagement ==
Each year, the school organises a "charity day", during which students raise funds for both local and international causes.

Through initiatives such as the Respectweek and a sustained focus on citizenship education, the school promotes social safety, inclusion, and diversity within the school community. In addition, RSG Enkhuizen observes Paarse Vrijdag ("Purple Friday"), a national awareness day in support of LGBTQ+ rights.
