= Hermann Wesselink College =

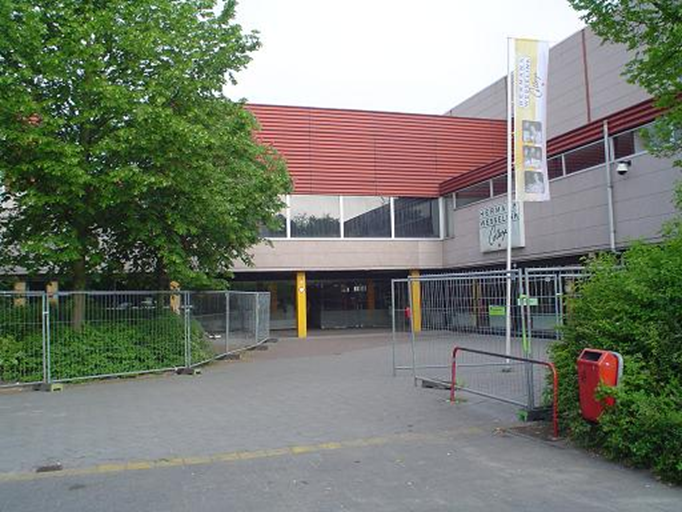
- The school in 2006, during the construction of a new parking lot for bikes.

Location
- Startbaan 3, 1185 XP Amstelveen, North Holland, The Netherlands
- Coordinates: 52.2875°N 4.8556°E

Information
- Founded: 1963
- Founder: Hermann Wesselink
- Head teacher: DHR. Kozijn
- Enrollment: 1866

The Hermann Wesselink College is a secondary school in Amstelveen, The Netherlands.

The school is named after Hermann Wesselink, a school principal who died at an early age, soon after retirement. The motto of the school is; "A school where everybody is equal but nobody is the same". In 2022 the school has 1866 students. The school offers vmbo, havo, vwo (atheneum and gymnasium), and in recent years bilingual education (IB Diploma in English at A2 level).

According to the "onderwijsinspectie", the Dutch school inspection, the results are what could be expected from these students.

== The New Building ==
In the late 2010s, plans were developed to replace the aging school facilities at the Hermann Wesselink College with a modern, sustainable building that could better support contemporary educational practices. After extensive planning and design phases involving students, teachers, and architects, the contract for the new building was awarded in September 2018 as a design & build project with RoosRos Architecten as lead designers and SMT Bouw & Vastgoed as the main contractor.

Construction began after the symbolic laying of the first pile in July 2019, with the new structure erected alongside the existing school to allow ongoing education during the build process. The new campus building, covering approximately 11,000 m^{2}, was completed and officially delivered in December 2020. It emphasizes spacious, light‑filled interiors, flexible learning spaces, and modern facilities, including larger classrooms, a theatre with a stage, dedicated study lounges, and specialised labs such as a beta (science) lab, media lab and international room.

The architectural concept centres on transparency and adaptability, with double‑height spaces and open vides creating visual connectivity between learning areas, while smaller dedicated zones provide quieter study environments. The design promotes interaction and flexibility, enabling the school to adapt internal layouts over time to meet evolving educational needs.

Sustainability was a core aspect of the project: the building operates gas‑free and was designed to meet the Dutch "Frisse Scholen" (Healthy Schools) criteria with high standards for indoor air quality and energy performance. bbn adviseurs In addition to the main educational facilities, a sports centre and upgraded outdoor spaces have expanded the school's offerings. The older school structures were subsequently demolished, and landscaping work continues to enhance the campus environment.

On 20 March 2025, the school celebrated the official opening of the new building and sports facilities with a ceremony attended by students, faculty, and local officials, marking the conclusion of the multi‑year development project (Even though the new building had been in use for four years at that point).
