= Bonaventure College (Netherlands) =

Bonaventura College

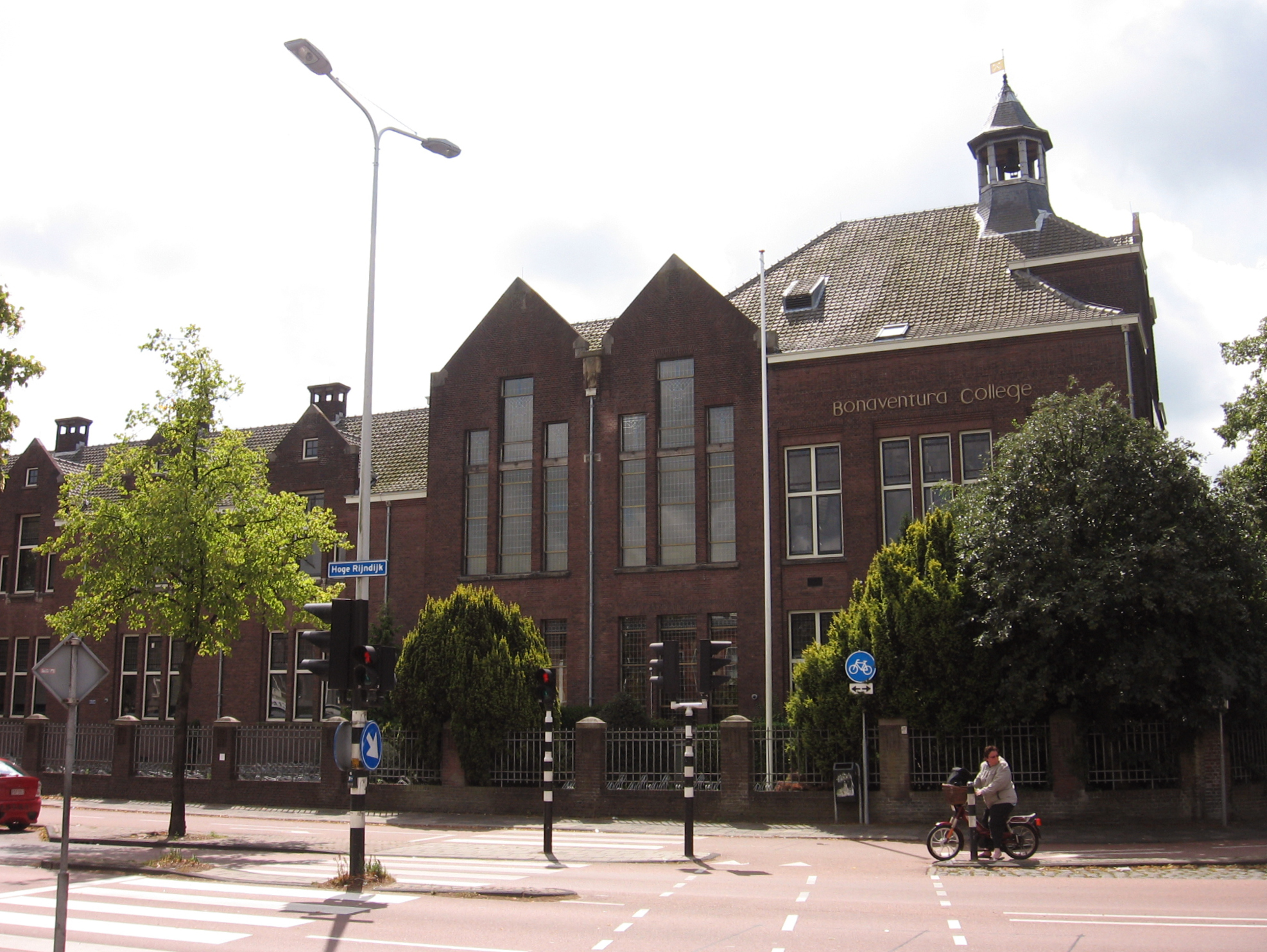

Location
- Leiden and Roelofarendsveen; Netherlands
- Coordinates: 52.15496°N 4.5081°E

Information
- Type: gymnasium, atheneum, HAVO, VMBO
- Denomination: Catholic
- Established: 1927; 99 years ago
- School board: Leiden Confessional Education Foundation
- Gender: Coeducational
- Enrollment: 2618 (school year 2009–2010)
- Website: www.bonaventuracollege.nl

Bonaventura College is a Catholic secondary school in Leiden, Netherlands. The school offers education in gymnasium, atheneum, HAVO, and VMBO. It has three branches in Leiden. Together with Visser 't Hooft Lyceum, it is part of the Leiden Confessional Education Foundation. It was preceded by the Jesuit St. Willibrord College of 1831 which moved to The Hague in 1927, leading to the founding in Leiden of St. Bonaventure by the Franciscans.

== Locations ==
=== Burggravenlaan ===
Bonaventura College Burggravenlaan provides gymnasium, atheneum, HAVO, and VMBO programmes. In 2010–2011 the school had 1057 pupils. It is housed in the Dudok building built in 1915, on the corner of Burggravenlaan and Hoge Rijndijk.

=== Boerhaavelaan ===
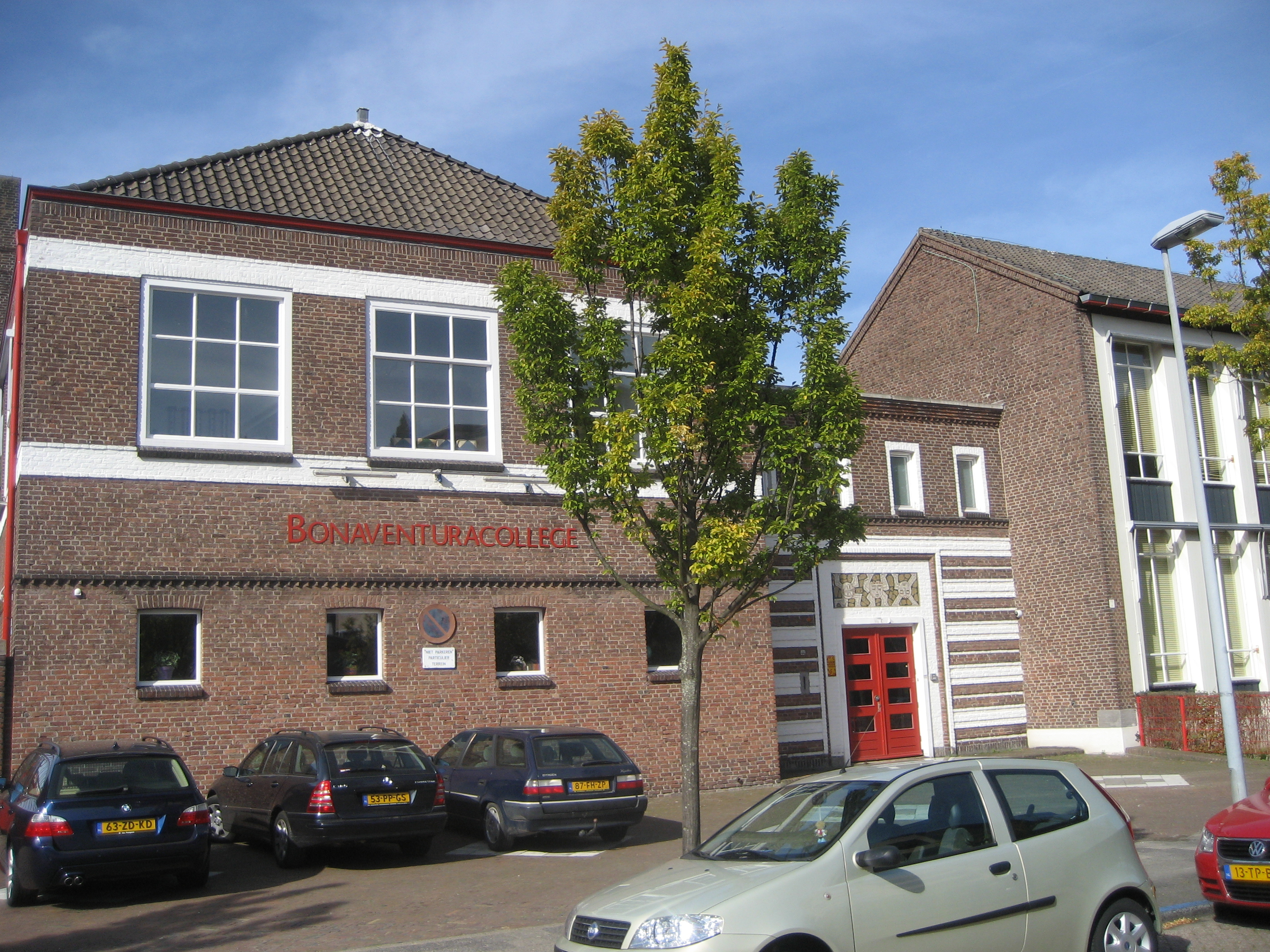
Boerhaavelaan

The Boerhaavelaan branch offers education at all VMBO levels. It offers third- and fourth-year students the choice between four professions: administration, engineering, electrical engineering and electronics. In 2009–2010 the school had 375 students.

=== Mariënpoelstraat ===
The Mariënpoelstraat branch offers gymnasium, atheneum, and HAVO educational programmes. It is housed in the former Franciscan monastery in Mariënpoelstraat. In 2015–2016 it had 1000 students.

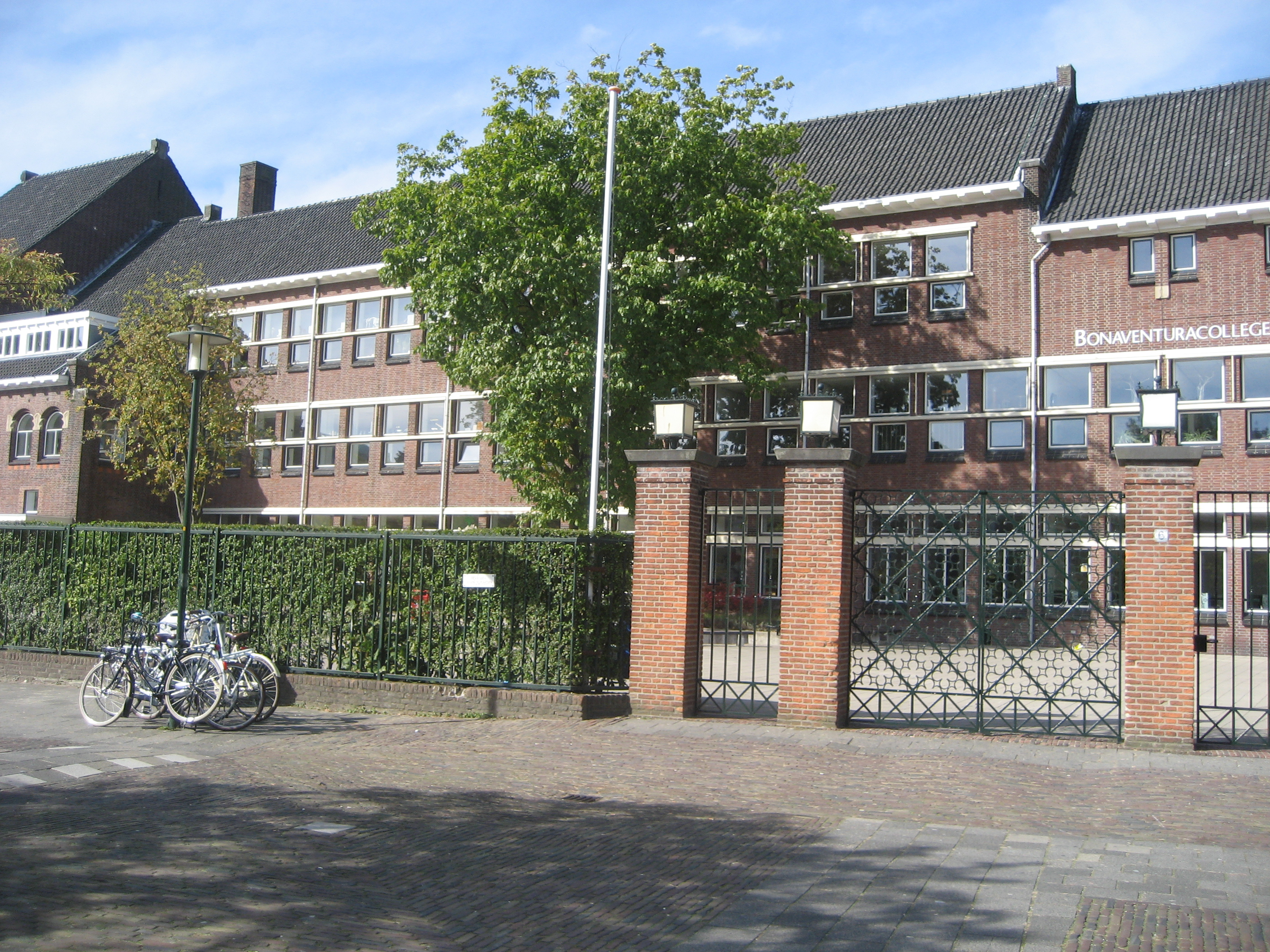
Mariënpoelstraat

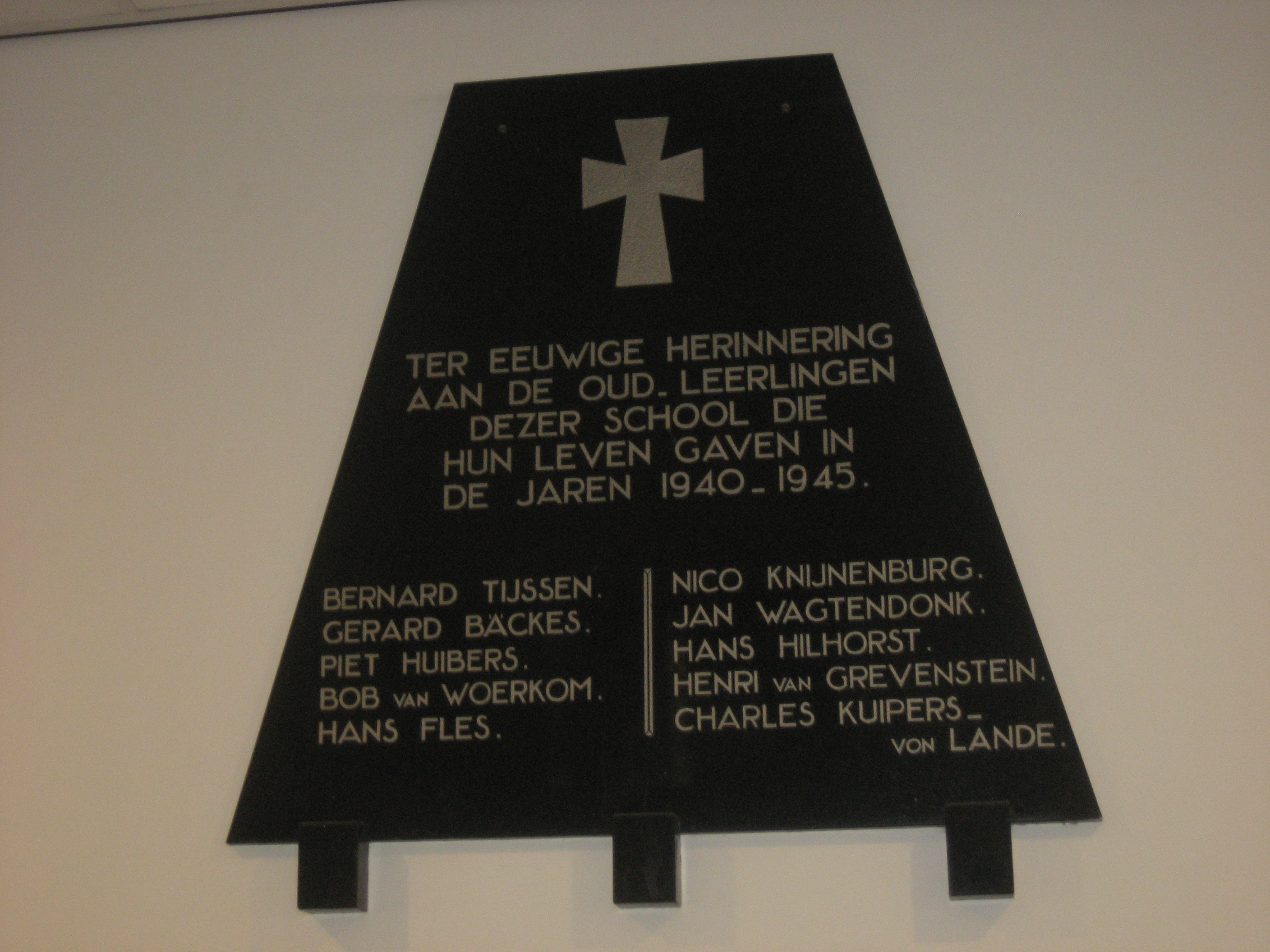
Memorial plaque

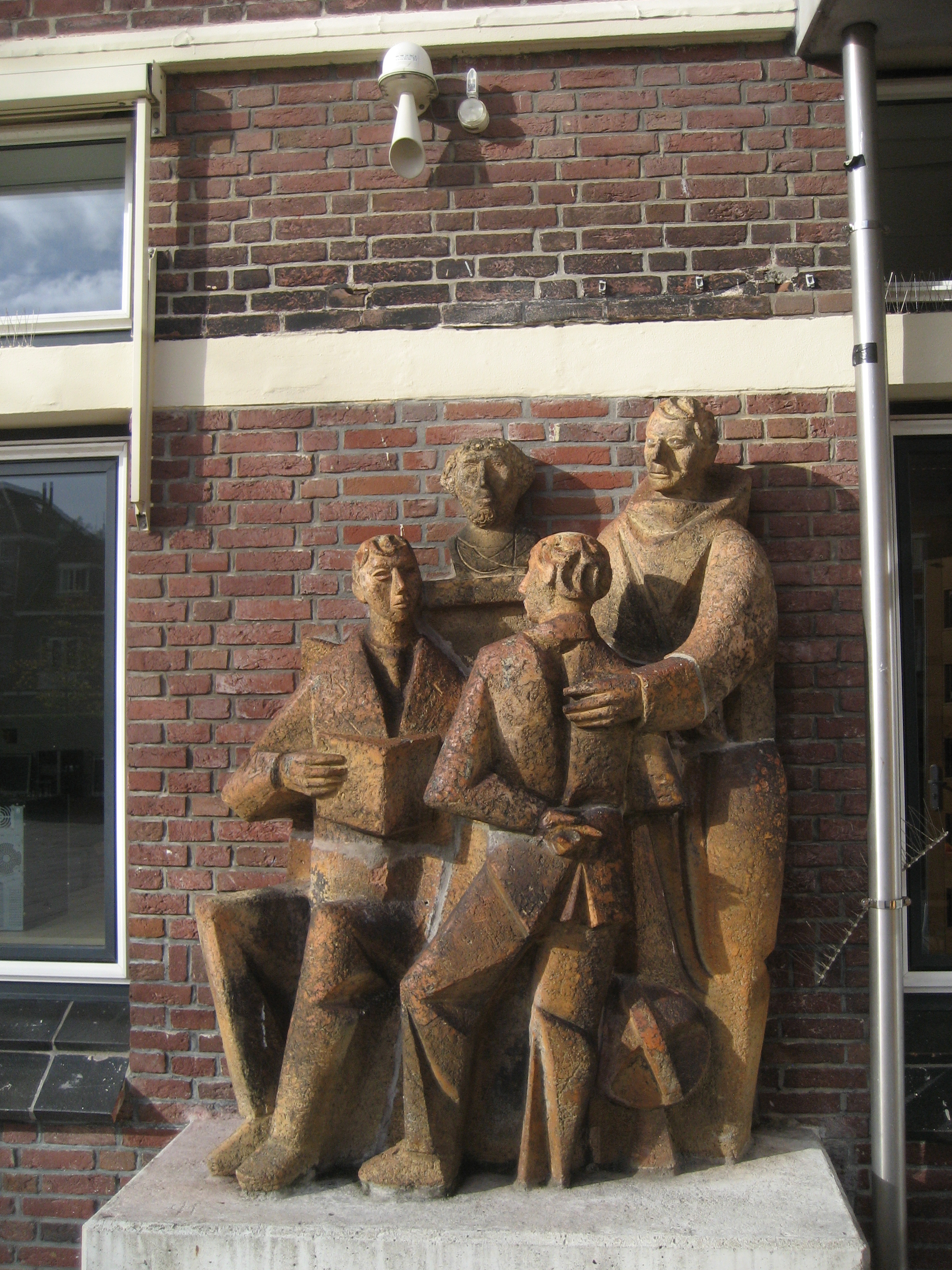
Statue

=== Roelofarendsveen ===
The Roelofarendsveen branch offers gymnasium, atheneum, HAVO, VMBO theoretical (MAVO) and middle-management vocational programmes. After their third year, gymnasium, atheneum, and HAVO students continue their education at the Mariënpoelstraat branch in Leiden. In 2009–2010 the school had 285 students..

This location was permanently shut down after the 2018–2019 school year.

== Alumni ==
- Boudewijn Büch poet, writer, television presenter, collector
- Femke Heemskerk swimmer, European and Olympic champion in 2008
- Carel Stolker professor and rector, Leiden University.
- Bettine Vriesekoop table tennis player, European champion in 1982 and 1992

== See also ==
- List of Jesuit sites

== Literature ==
- Van Woerden, HAJM, "Bonaventura, memorial book at the fiftieth anniversary" (1977);
- Heruer, LMM (ed.), "Van Griffel tot Muis. 150 Years Catholic Education in Leiden 1846–1996 (1996
