= Markland (disambiguation) =

Markland is the name given by the Icelandic Norseman Leifur Eiríksson to an area of North America.

Markland may also refer to:

== Places ==
- Markland, Newfoundland and Labrador, Canada, a settlement
- Markland, Indiana, U.S., an unincorporated community

== Facilities and structures ==
- Markland (St. Augustine, Florida), U.S., a historic mansion
- Markland Locks and Dam, on the Ohio River between Kentucky and Indiana in the U.S.
- Markland Mall, Komomo, Indiana, USA; a shopping mall
- Markland College, in Oudenbosch and Zevenbergen, Netherlands

== Other uses ==
- Markland (surname)
- Markland (Scots), a unit of land measurement

== See also ==
- Markland Hill, Bolton, Greater Manchester, England, UK
- Markland Wood, Toronto, Ontario, Canada
- Mark (disambiguation)
- Land (disambiguation)
