= Lyceum Schöndeln =

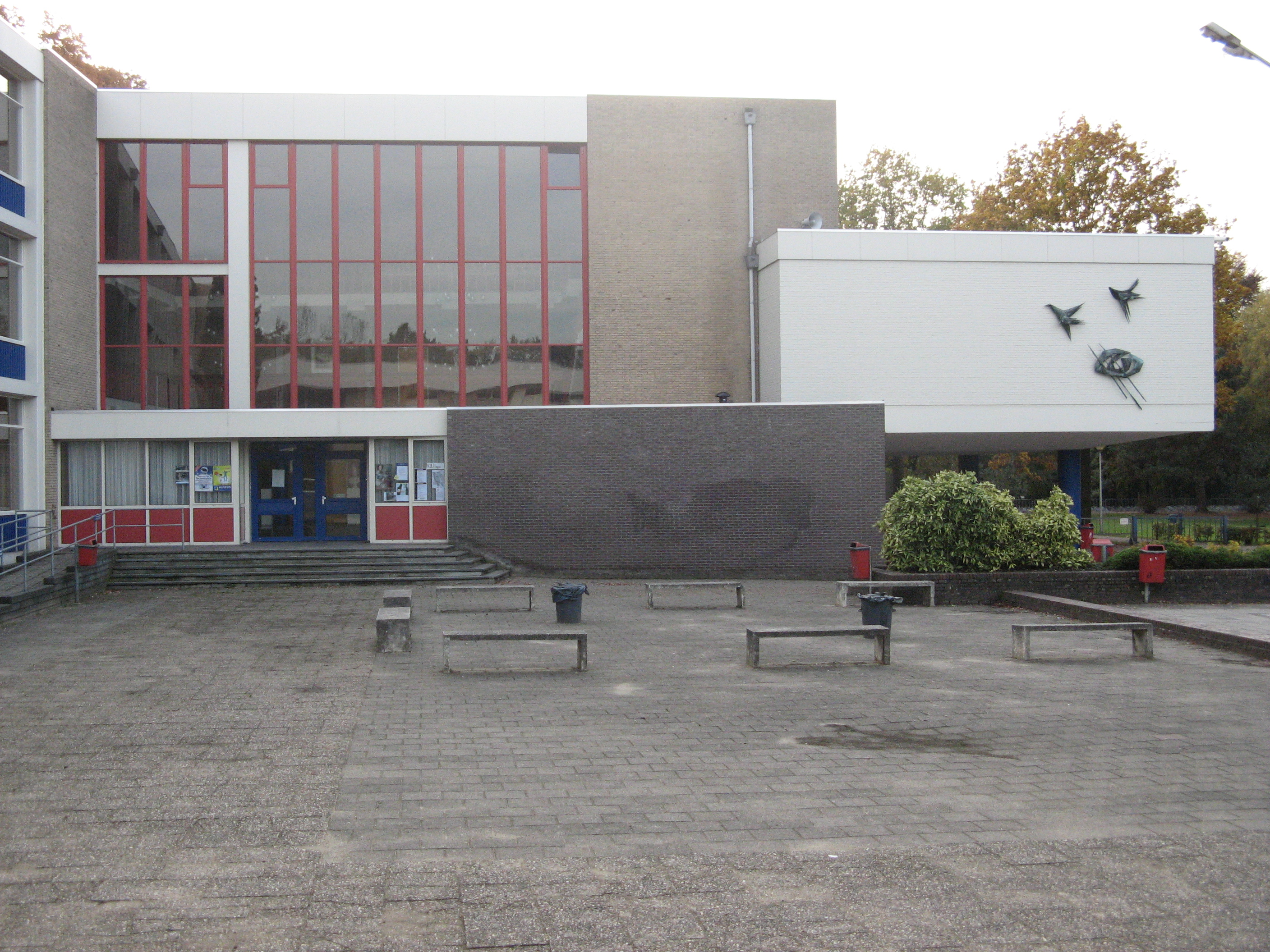
- Entrance to main building

Location
- Heinsbergerweg 184; 6045 CK Roermond; Netherlands
- Coordinates: 51°10′14″N 6°00′05″E

Information
- Established: 2007
- School board: Stichting Onderwijs Midden-Limburg
- Rector: R. Menting
- Teaching staff: 80 (2011)
- Enrollment: 1060 (2011)
- Website: lyceumschondeln.mwp.nl

Lyceum Schöndeln is a secondary school in Roermond, Netherlands. It combines a havo, an atheneum and a gymnasium and incorporates specialisations in both the arts (cultuurprofielschool) and the exact sciences (technasium). The school was formed in 2007 from the merger of the Stedelijk Lyceum and the Bisschoppelijk College Schöndeln.

== History ==
=== Bisschoppelijk College Schöndeln ===
The Bisschoppelijk College (Episcopal College), a Catholic secondary school, opened in the centre of Roermond in 1851; in order to expand, it moved to a new building in the Schöndeln estate in 1961. In 1964, the school was issued a building permit for a boarding school, which initially drew students from all over the Netherlands, but then declined in size and was closed in 1993.

== Stedelijk Lyceum ==
The Rijks Hogere Burgerschool (National Higher Secondary School) opened in 1864, also in the centre of Roermond. In 1980 it moved to a new building on the east side of the city and changed its name to Stedelijk Lyceum (Municipal Lyceum).

=== Fusion to form Lyceum Schöndeln ===
In 2007, the two schools were combined to form Lyceum Schöndeln, which is housed in the former buildings of Bisschoppelijk College Schöndeln. It offers the havo and university entrance (vwo: Voorbereidend wetenschappelijk onderwijs) tracks, consisting of atheneum and gymnasium; a new school, Mavo Roermond, provides vocationally oriented lower secondary or middle-school education (mavo: Middelbaar algemeen voortgezet onderwijs) in the former buildings of the Stedelijk Lyceum, and another new school, Niekée, is a vmbo and occupies a new building. Together with a Dutch as a Second Language division, the schools together form Mundium College, run by the Stichting Onderwijs Midden-Limburg. One other Roermond secondary school, Bisschoppelijk College Broekhin, continues to exist.

Lyceum Schöndeln has been a cultuurprofielschool and a technasium since 2009. As of 2011, there were 1060 students and 80 teachers (66 full-time equivalency).

== Buildings ==
The school has several buildings. Most classes are housed in the main building, as are media labs, cafeterias, gyms and the staff room, but other buildings have also been adapted to provide classroom space to meet increasing need. The former dormitory was first used as classroom space and then demolished and replaced with an annexe. The former chapel has been adapted to a "bioblock" containing biology labs. The caretaker's residence was for a while used for guidance and as meeting space, but has now also been demolished and replaced with temporary classroom buildings.

== Extracurricular activities ==
A number of extracurricular activities take place throughout the school year, including outings, carnival, a drama and musical evening, a film festival, a debating contest, a coffee concert, and the school dance. Students can also participate in the Technische Toneel Commissie (theatre tech commission), Organisatie & PodiumActiviteiten (organisation and podium activities), student parliament, and band. There is also a school newspaper, the LenS, started in 2009.

== Notable alumni of Lyceum Schöndeln or its precursors ==
- Gerd Leers
