= Bataafs Lyceum =

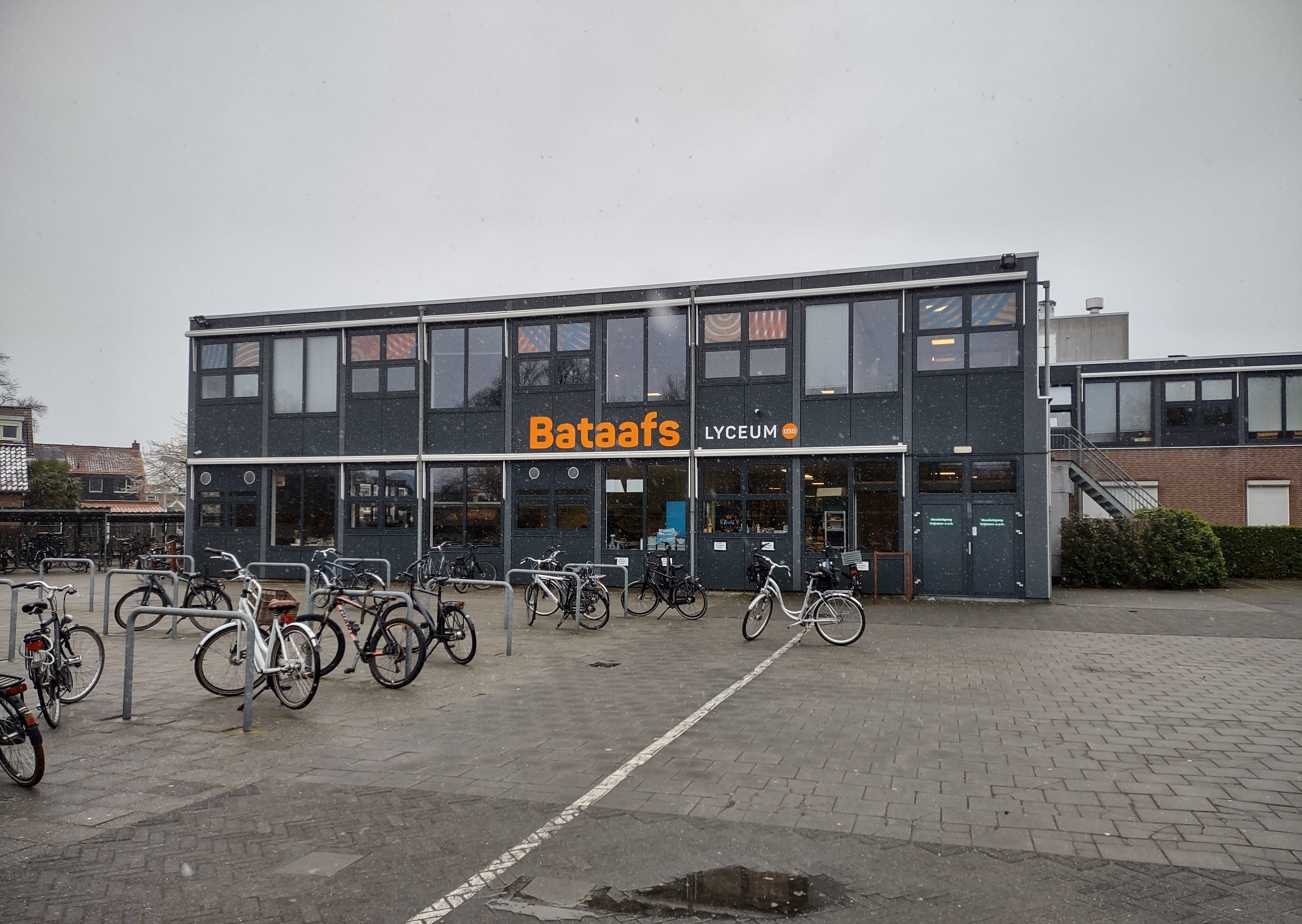
- Bataafs Lyceum in 2021

Location
- Hengelo; Netherlands; 52.274046°N 6.798016°E

Information
- Type: Public High School
- Established: 1911
- Rector: J. Duijvestijn, J. Ardesch, B. Smies
- Grades: 6–12
- Color
- Pupils: Batavieren
- Website: bataafslyceum.nl

The Bataafs Lyceum is a public high school in Hengelo, Netherlands. The Bataafs Lyceum is part of a public school division called the Openbare Scholengemeenschap Hengelo and offers HAVO and VWO level education.

The building is located at the Sloetsweg, next to the Montessori College Twente and diagonally opposite to the Avila College Hengelo.

In 2008 the Bataafs Lyceum decided to drop the VMBO education level in order to change its name from Bataafse Kamp to Bataafs Lyceum.

In 2009, Bataafs Lyceum started with a programme for vwo students called the Masterclass. In the Masterclass, more talented pupils follow a programme for three years, focused on the development of their cognitive as well as social-emotional competences. The regular lesson scheme is more compact and there is more room for thinking outside the box and academic broadening.

In 2014/2015 the Bataafs Lyceum had about 840 students. The school teaches havo and vwo (both atheneum and gymnasium).

As of 2018, the school has about 1000 students.

== Notable Alumni ==
- Mark van Vugt (1967), evolutionary psychologist
- Gerben Wynia (1958), literary essayist and biographer; editor-in-chief of Flanor
- Sander Schimmelpenninck (1984), journalist and presenter
