= Sondervick College =

Catholic secondary school in the Netherlands

Coordinates: 51.4039°N 5.3839°E

The Sondervick College is a Dutch catholic secondary school located in the village Veldhoven (province North Brabant). It provides all three levels of Dutch secondary education: VMBO, HAVO, VWO (and TTO meaning bilingual education at HAVO and VWO-level).

== The Dutch Secondary School System ==
The Dutch system for secondary schools has been divided into three different levels of education:

- VMBO

Full name in Dutch: Voorbereidend Middelbaar Beroeps-Onderwijs
Literal meaning: Preparatory Secondary Vocational Education
Existing out of various directions; E.g. Construction & Technique, Welfare & Care, etc.
Practical approach
4 years

- HAVO

Full name in Dutch: Hoger Algemeen Voortgezet Onderwijs
Literal meaning: Higher General Secondary Education
Theoretical approach
5 years

- VWO

Full name in Dutch: Voorbereidend Wetenschappelijk Onderwijs
Literal meaning: Preparatory Scientific Education (pre-university education)
Consisting of two directions: Gymnasium (includes the extra subjects Greek, Latin and Classical Culture) and Athenaeum (Consists of only the standard VWO-subjects, however does not include Greek, Latin or Classical Culture).
Theoretical approach
6 years

In the Netherlands children enter secondary school around the age of twelve and - depending on the level of education - graduate around the age of either sixteen, seventeen or eighteen.

Sondervick College provides education on all three of these levels. In 2008 the school first started teaching TTO, meaning not just the regular Gymnasium and Athenaeum (where all subjects are taught in Dutch) can be followed, but also the bilingual variants (where in the first three years 70-75% of the subjects are taught in English instead of Dutch) can be followed.

== Management ==
Robert Tops

== History ==
=== Old Locations ===
The Sondervick College was founded in 1995 consisting of the following schools:

- The Anton van Duinkerkencollege for HAVO and VWO
- The Veldhof schoolcommunity for VBO and MAVO
- MAVO Koningshof
- MAVO Selsterhorst
- VSO De Stolberg

=== New Location ===
In 2007 the school moved to its new location: The Kempen Campus, consisting of the six buildings A to F and the adjacent athletics track and sports fields.

The school is housed in the buildings A, D, E and F. The HAVO and VWO education is housed in A. The VMBO education is housed in E and F. Building D is the central building (Used by students of each level). It includes a big canteen, a stage for school events and special classrooms for subjects as music, drama, handicraft and art.

The buildings B and C house indoor sports facilities like a gym, fitness room and gymnastics hall. These buildings, as well as the athletics track and sports fields, are used by not only the school (for Physical Education) but also by various sports clubs.
