= Zernike College =

Group of secondary schools in the Netherlands

Information
- Type: vmbo-bb, vmbo-kb, vmbo-tl, havo, Atheneum, Atheneum plus
- Motto: Helder in leren, Harens Lyceum
- Denomination: Publick
- Founded: 1918
- Director: Harens Lyceum: Wiebe Terpstra; Montessori Vaklyceum: Onne Folkeringa; Montessori Lyceum Groningen: Arno Moeijes
- Enrollment: Harens Lyceum: 1590 (2017-2018); Montessori Vaklyceum: ca. 650 (2017-2018); Montessori Lyceum Groningen: ca. 1000 (2017-2018)
- Website: www.harenslyceum.nl www.montessorivaklyceum.nl www.montessorilyceumgroningen.nl

The Zernike College is a Dutch group of secondary schools, consisting of the Harens Lyceum, the Montessori Lyceum Groningen and the Montessori Vaklyceum.

== History ==
The Zernike College is named after Nobel Prize winner Frits Zernike. The Zernike College was founded in 1918 as a municipal hbs in Groningen. In 1968, the school was named Zernike College. In 2015, it was decided to divide the Zernike College into three schools because the original school had become too big. Every year, the schools organize a Cultural Marathon, a four-day culture and sporting event. The Harens Lyceum and Montessori Lyceum Groningen have an exchange program with many schools elsewhere in Europe.

== Current schools ==
The Harens Lyceum has locations in Haren and Zuidlaren. The school offers vmbo-tl, havo, Atheneum and Atheneum+. Students may also attend the school for vmbo-bb and kb, but only for the first two years.

The Montessori Vaklyceum is a Montessori school with two locations in Groningen. The school offers vmbo-bb, kb and tl. In collaboration with the Montessori Lyceum Groningen, the school offers a program for students who are not sure whether they want to follow TL or Havo.

The Montessori Lyceum Groningen is a Montessori school in Groningen. The school offers havo and Atheneum.
