= Udens College =

Secondary school in Uden, Netherlands

- Udens College
- Uden, North Brabant; Netherlands

Information
- Type: Secondary school (scholengemeenschap)
- Established: 1743 (roots); 1990s (current form)
- Staff: ≈400
- Grades: 7–12 (vmbo, havo, vwo)
- Enrollment: ≈2,800 students
- Affiliation: Public (with Catholic historical roots)
- Locations: President Kennedylaan 22b (havo/vwo); Kleinveld 25 (vmbo), Uden, Netherlands
- Website: www.udenscollege.nl

Udens College is a large secondary school (scholengemeenschap) in Uden, in the municipality of Maashorst, North Brabant, Netherlands. It offers education from preparatory secondary vocational level (vmbo) to pre-university level (vwo), including gymnasium and a Waldorf-inspired (vrijeschool) stream.

The school serves approximately 2,800 students and has around 400 staff members. It emphasizes personalized coaching, small-scale learning environments, blended learning, international activities, and a safe school climate.

== History ==
Secondary education in Uden traces its roots to 1743, when a Latin school was founded by the Cross Brothers (Kruisheren) of the Order of the Holy Cross. In 1886, the College of the Holy Cross (College van het Heilige Kruis) was established, initially focused on priestly training but later opening to lay students.

Following the 1968 Mammoetwet education reform, the school expanded to include havo in 1969 and developed into a full atheneum. In 1975, it split into separate entities (Kruisheren Kollege and Rivendell College), but in the 1990s, the Catholic and public streams merged under the Stichting voor Katholiek Voortgezet Onderwijs Uden (S.K.V.O.U.) to form the unified Udens College. The name honors the historical College of the Holy Cross and the Kruisheren legacy.

== Campuses and facilities ==
Udens College operates on two main locations in Uden:

- Havo/vwo sector (51.6621°N 5.6276°E): President Kennedylaan 22b, 5402 KD Uden (modern buildings with glass elements and green surroundings)
- Vmbo sector (51.6620°N 5.6114°E): Kleinveld 25, 5401 ZW Uden

The school uses eduroam Wi-Fi, supports Bring Your Own Device (BYOD), and has upgraded to Wi-Fi 6 for high connectivity.

== Education ==
Udens College offers:

- Vmbo (including vmbo-T/technical and practical streams; features programs like "TOOL")
- Havo (5 years)
- Vwo (6 years), including atheneum, gymnasium (classical languages), and vwo-plus projects
- Vrijeschoolonderwijs (Waldorf/Steiner-inspired) for vmbo-t, havo, and vwo levels since around 2021, focusing on holistic development ("head, heart, and hands")

Key elements include personal mentoring, support teams, blended learning with digital tools, international exchanges (e.g., GLOBE environmental program, partnerships in Europe and Turkey), open days, MBO fairs, and charity events.

== Notable alumni ==
- Rob Jetten – Politician, current Prime Minister of the Netherlands (attended 1999–2005).
- Bertus Aafjes – Writer and poet
- Peter Kerris – Politician
- Maartje Krekelaar – Field hockey player
- Gaby Milder – Actress
- Gwen van Poorten – Presenter
- Rik van de Westelaken – Journalist and newsreader
- Giel de Winter – Presenter and YouTuber
- Marcel Wouda – Olympic swimmer

== See also ==
- Education in the Netherlands
- List of secondary schools in the Netherlands
