= Academie Tien =

Coordinates: 52.0956°N 5.0713°E

- Berlijnplein 300, Leidsche Rijn, Utrecht

Information
- Type: Secondary school (offers MAVO, HAVO, and VWO (primary school teaching also available for children 10 and over))
- Established: 2015
- Rector: Richard van den Berg
- Enrollment: 1075
- Website: Academie Tien

Academie Tien (Note: English: Academy Ten) (stylized as ACADEMİE TİEN), originally Mavo Tien, is a Dutch primary and secondary school located in Leidsche Rijn, Utrecht. Originally opening in 2015 as Mavo Tien, they rebranded to Academie Tien in 2018 and have expanded to have over 1000 students as of 2024. They offer teaching on the MAVO, HAVO and VWO levels, as well as on the primary school level for children 10 and over.

== History ==
=== Mavo Tien ===
The school officially opened in 2015 as Mavo Tien, which only offered education to students in the MAVO level. There were originally only 73 students making up 3 classes and 8 teachers, with around 600 others applying to become teachers. The school immediately wished to expand to include education in the HAVO level.

=== Academie Tien ===
On 1 August 2018, the school changed its name to Academie Tien and started enrolling students in the HAVO and VWO levels, opening its new website on 6 November. The school originally intended to move to the Berlijnplein with its rebranding, though they were only able to move in 2023.

In 2024, the school had 1075 students in total, including primary school students. The school is part of Nuovo, a Dutch organisation managing multiple schools in the Netherlands.

Currently, the school offers teaching on the MAVO, HAVO and VWO levels, as well as on the primary school level for children 10 and over. They have entirely banned mobile phone usage.

Since 1 August 2024, Richard van den Berg has been the rector of the school, replacing Albert Wijnsma.

== Grading ==
The school does not grade students using numbers, which is unusual to Dutch secondary schools. Instead, they use three terms: ontwikkeling (failed), beheerst (passed), and expert (good).
