= Bouwens van der Boijecollege =

Coordinates: 51.3204°N 5.9788°E

The Bouwens van der Boijecollege is a public high school located in Panningen, the Netherlands. There are four different levels of education enrollment: vmbo, havo, atheneum, gymnasium. The school follows the Dutch national public school system, which is highly centralized in the Netherlands. The government sets standards, evaluates, and provides financial needs to fulfill the educational needs.

== History ==
The Blariacum college in Blerick opened up a dependence in Panningen in 1973. A year later the school became independent and was named after the first Lord of the town "Bouwens van der Boije". The school used to have three different faculty buildings, but has now merged into one. The school's is also referred to as the "BBC".
