= Marieke Vellinga-Beemsterboer =

Dutch politician (born 1986)

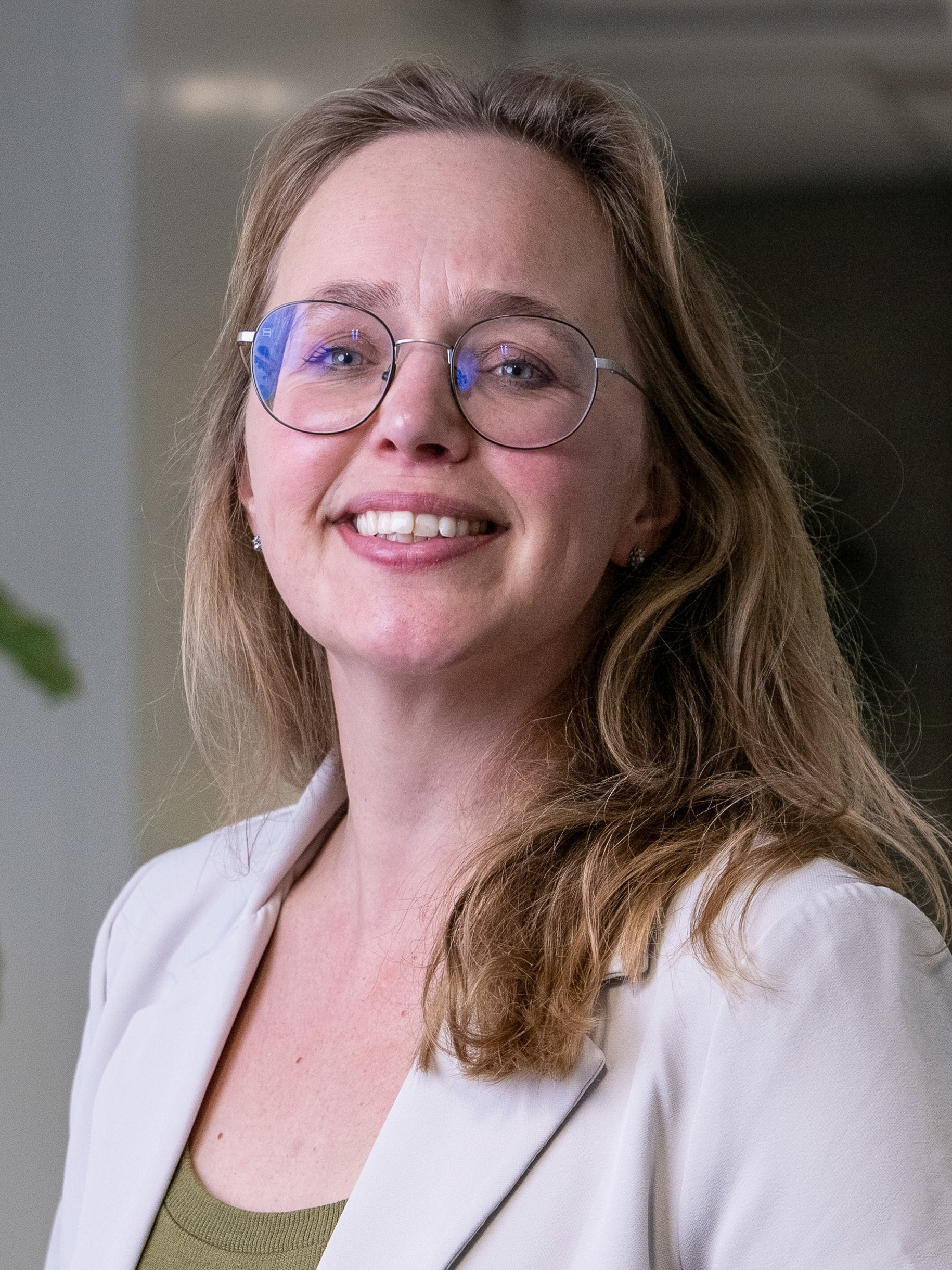
- Vellinga-Beemsterboer in 2026

Member of the House of Representatives
- Incumbent
- Assumed office 12 November 2025

Alderman of Vlieland
- In office 31 October 2022 – 12 November 2025

Municipal councillor of Súdwest-Fryslân
- In office December 2016 – October 2022

Provincial councillor of Friesland
- In office March 2015 – January 2017

Personal details
- Born: Maria Cornelia Anna Beemsterboer; 27 May 1986 (age 40) Hoorn, Netherlands
- Party: Democrats 66
- Education: NHL University of Applied Sciences (B.Ed.)

Maria Cornelia Anna "Marieke" Vellinga-Beemsterboer (born 27 May 1986) is a Dutch politician of the Democrats 66 (D66). In the 2025 Dutch general election, she was the 27th candidate on the candidate list for the House of Representatives. She was elected on preferential votes. She previously served as an alderman of Vlieland since 2022.

== Early life ==
Vellinga-Beemsterboer was born on 27 May 1986 in Hoorn, North Holland. She grew up in the West Friesland region, attending primary school in Hoorn and Hoogkarspel and completing her secondary education at Martinus College in Grootebroek. After obtaining her HAVO diploma, she briefly studied communication at the Hanze University of Applied Sciences in Groningen, and then trained as an English teacher at the NHL University of Applied Sciences in Leeuwarden.

== Career ==
Vellinga-Beemsterboer began her professional career in education, working as an English teacher at Marne College in Bolsward from 2007 to 2019. She then joined Stichting Lezen & Schrijven, an organisation dedicated to literacy, as an advisor and project leader, focusing on functional illiteracy and communication.

=== Political career ===
Vellinga-Beemsterboer's political career developed steadily across different levels of government. She first became active in provincial politics as a staff member for the Democrats 66 (D66) group in Friesland between 2012 and 2015, and subsequently served as a member of the provincial council from 2015 to 2017. In 2016, she entered municipal politics as a councillor in Súdwest-Fryslân, where she also served as leader of the D66 council group until 2022. That year, she was appointed alderman of Vlieland, responsible for economic affairs, education, environment, social policy and public health.

In the 2025 general election, she stood as candidate number 27 on the D66 list. Through preferential votes, she was elected into the House of Representatives and was installed on 12 November 2025. Her electoral success was, in part, attributed to the Stem op een Vrouw (lit. 'Vote for a Woman') campaign, which encourages voters to use preferential votes for women lower on party lists in order to increase female representation in politics. In parliament, Vellinga-Beemsterboer focuses on issues related to water and the Wadden, shipping, fisheries, horticulture, and animal welfare.

== Personal life ==
Vellinga-Beemsterboer is married and has three children. She lives in Boazum, Friesland.

== Electoral history ==
Electoral history of Marieke Vellinga-Beemsterboer
Year	Body	Party	Pos.	Votes	Result		Ref.
Year	Body	Party	Pos.	Votes	Party seats	Individual	Ref.
2014	Súdwest-Fryslân Municipal Council	Democrats 66	7	[?]	3	Lost (Note: Vellinga-Beemsterboer was appointed to the body later during the term due to a vacancy.)	
2015	Provincial Council of Friesland	Democrats 66	3	1,070	3	Won	
2017	Súdwest-Fryslân Municipal Council	Democrats 66	2	[?]	2	Won	
2021	House of Representatives	Democrats 66	45	837	45	Lost	
2022	Súdwest-Fryslân Municipal Council	Democrats 66	2	338	2	Won	
2025	House of Representatives	Democrats 66	27	36,576	26	Won (Note: Vellinga-Beemsterboer received enough preferential votes to be elected despite her party's result.)	
