= KGC =

KGC may refer to:

- Korea Ginseng Corporation, Seoul
- Kahnawake Gaming Commission, Quebec, Canada
- Knights of the Golden Circle, southern US secret society 1854-1864
- KGC (band)
- Knight Grand Cross, an honour in some countries
- Kiev Gothic Clan, a subculture
- KNX (AM), a radio station in Los Angeles (original call sign: KGC)

== Education ==
- Karel de Grote College, Nijmegen, Netherlands
- Kelston Girls’ College, a school in West Auckland, New Zealand

== Sport ==
- Ken Galluccio Cup, for lacrosse clubs in Europe
- Kodaikanal Golf Club, Tamil Nadu, India
- Kurmitola Golf Club, Dhaka, Bangladesh
- Kandy Garden Club, Sri Lanka, a sports and social club

== Transport ==
- Kacha Ghari railway station, Pakistan (station code: KGC)
- Kingscote Airport, South Australia (IATA code: KGC)
