= Lodewijk College =

- Terneuzen; Netherlands

Information
- Type: Multi-campus secondary school
- Motto: Enrich your world!
- Established: 2018 (merger)
- Principal: Patricia Waerniers
- Grades: Vmbo (pre-vocational secondary education), Havo (higher general secondary education), Atheneum, Gymnasium
- Enrollment: ▲2193
- Campuses: 'Zeldenrustlaan' and 'Oude Vaart'
- Website: www.lodewijkcollege.nl

The Lodewijk College is a secondary school in Terneuzen, Zeeland, in the region of Zeelandic Flanders (Zeeuws-Vlaanderen), Netherlands. The school is the result of a merger between "Stedelijk Scholen Gemeenschap de Rede" and the "Zeldenrust-Steelantcollege", and offers education at various levels.

The school organization was named in 2018 after the American astronaut and chemist Lodewijk van den Berg, who was born in Sluiskil.

This general-access regional school with a Christian background provides education to students from Terneuzen and surrounding towns such as Axel, Zaamslag, Sas van Gent, Sluiskil, Westdorpe, and Hoek.

== History ==
The Stedelijk Scholen Gemeenschap de Rede was founded in 1994 through a merger between the Petrus Hondius Lyceum (mavo, havo, atheneum and gymnasium) and LTS de Vaart.

The Zeldenrust-Steelantcollege was established in 1995 from a merger of the Zeldenrustcollege (mavo, havo and vwo) and the Roman Catholic Steelant scholengemeenschap (vbo-mavo).

After the merger of these two schools, the new name Lodewijk College was chosen, as a tribute to the astronaut and chemist Lodewijk van den Berg, who was born in Sluiskil. He was present during the official unveiling on 20 August 2018.

== Campuses ==
The Lodewijk College has two campuses in the center of Terneuzen.

Zeldenrustlaan campus – formerly the site of the Zeldenrust-Steelantcollege. This campus offers education at the havo and vwo levels (including bilingual education). It currently has 1,178 students.

Oude Vaart campus – formerly home to the Stedelijk Scholen Gemeenschap de Rede. This campus houses the vmbo (pre-vocational secondary education) department and the EOA (Eerste Opvang Anderstaligen, or First Reception for Non-Dutch-speaking students). This campus has 1,015 students.

=== New educational campus ===
A new educational campus is scheduled to open in 2028, bringing together all 2,200 students under one roof. The site will also include space for businesses, green areas, and sports facilities. A total budget of 100 million euros has been allocated for the "Campus Terneuzen" project.

== Educational programmes ==
Lodewijk College offers a broad range of study levels. At the havo and vwo levels, bilingual education is available.

=== VWO ===
- Voorbereidend wetenschappelijk onderwijs (pre-university education), a six-year programme preparing students for university studies.
- Divided into (bilingual) Atheneum and (bilingual) Gymnasium streams.
- From the fourth year onwards, students choose one of four profiles:
  - Culture and Society
  - Economics and Society
  - Nature and Health
  - Nature and Technology

=== HAVO ===
- Hoger algemeen voortgezet onderwijs (higher general secondary education), a five-year programme preparing students for higher professional education (hbo).
- From the fourth year onwards, students choose one of four profiles:
  - Culture and Society
  - Economics and Society
  - Nature and Health
  - Nature and Technology

=== VMBO ===
- Voorbereidend middelbaar beroepsonderwijs (pre-vocational secondary education), a four-year programme preparing students for mbo (senior secondary vocational education).
- Four learning pathways, differing in level and proportion of theoretical vs. vocational training:
  - vmbo basis
  - vmbo kader
  - vmbo gemengde leerweg
  - vmbo theoretische leerweg
- From the third year, students choose one of four vocational profiles:
  - Hospitality, Bakery and Recreation (HBR)
  - Care & Welfare (Zorg & Welzijn)
  - Services & Products (Dienstverlening & Producten)
  - Technology (vakmanschapsroute techniek or Bètachallenge in vmbo-tl)
- Vocational programmes are also offered within the continuous vmbo–mbo learning pathway (pre-MBO).

=== EOA ===
The school also provides Eerste Opvang Anderstaligen (EOA – First Reception for Non-Dutch-speaking students).

== Extracurricular activities ==
The school places strong emphasis on extracurricular activities. As a school community located on the banks of the Western Scheldt (Westerschelde), Lodewijk College has an international outlook and integrates learning objectives related to Global citizenship and the Sustainable Development Goals (SDGs) of the United Nations.

=== Lodewijk Academy ===
In 2025, the Lodewijk Academy and Lodewijk Academy Junior were launched. These programmes offer lectures and activities covering a wide range of scientific, social, and cultural topics. Prominent figures are invited to speak, both for students and for the broader community. The conferences cover themes aligned with three central topics. Speakers have included Sandra Roelofs, Jan Leyers, Stijn Ilsen, and Mart de Kruif.

=== Sterrenjacht ===
The Sterrenjacht ("Star Hunt") at Lodewijk College is a large annual school-wide talent show where students and staff showcase their creative talents — singing, dancing, sketches, presentations, and more. In addition to performances, artworks are exhibited, and students take on roles behind the scenes in technical production, catering, security, organization, makeup, and so on. The event takes place at the Scheldetheater and sells out every year.

=== Other projects ===
The school participates in various Erasmus projects and international exchanges. In 2025, study trips and exchanges were organized to more than seven countries, leading to joint projects with students abroad.

In collaboration with the art organization Human Activities, an exhibition featuring student artworks opened in Congo in September 2025. The project is part of a partnership between Human Activities and Lodewijk College to develop new art platforms. A similar platform — called a "White Cube" — will soon open in Zeeland, following the same model as in Lusanga: using art to help communities reclaim their history, land, and future.

== Notable alumni ==
- Winfried Baijens, news anchor
- Leen van Duivendijk, artist
- Hugo de Jonge, politician
- Jos de Putter, documentary filmmaker
- Ad Verbrugge, philosopher
- Sandra Roelofs, former First Lady of Georgia
- Siawaash Cyrroes, actor
