= Wynia =

Wynia is a surname. Notable people with the surname include:

- Ann Wynia (born 1943), American politician
- Gerben Wynia (born 1958), Dutch literary essayist and biographer
- Matthew K. Wynia (born 1964), American physician and bioethicist
