= Scholengemeenschap Augustinianum =

Coordinates: 51°25′58″N 5°29′54″E

Location
- Dirk Boutslaan 25; Eindhoven, North Brabant; Netherlands

Information
- Type: Secondary School
- Patron saint: Augustine
- Opened: 1898
- School board: Carmelcollege
- Rector: Marc van Dongen MME
- Language: Dutch
- Website: http://www.augustinianum.nl

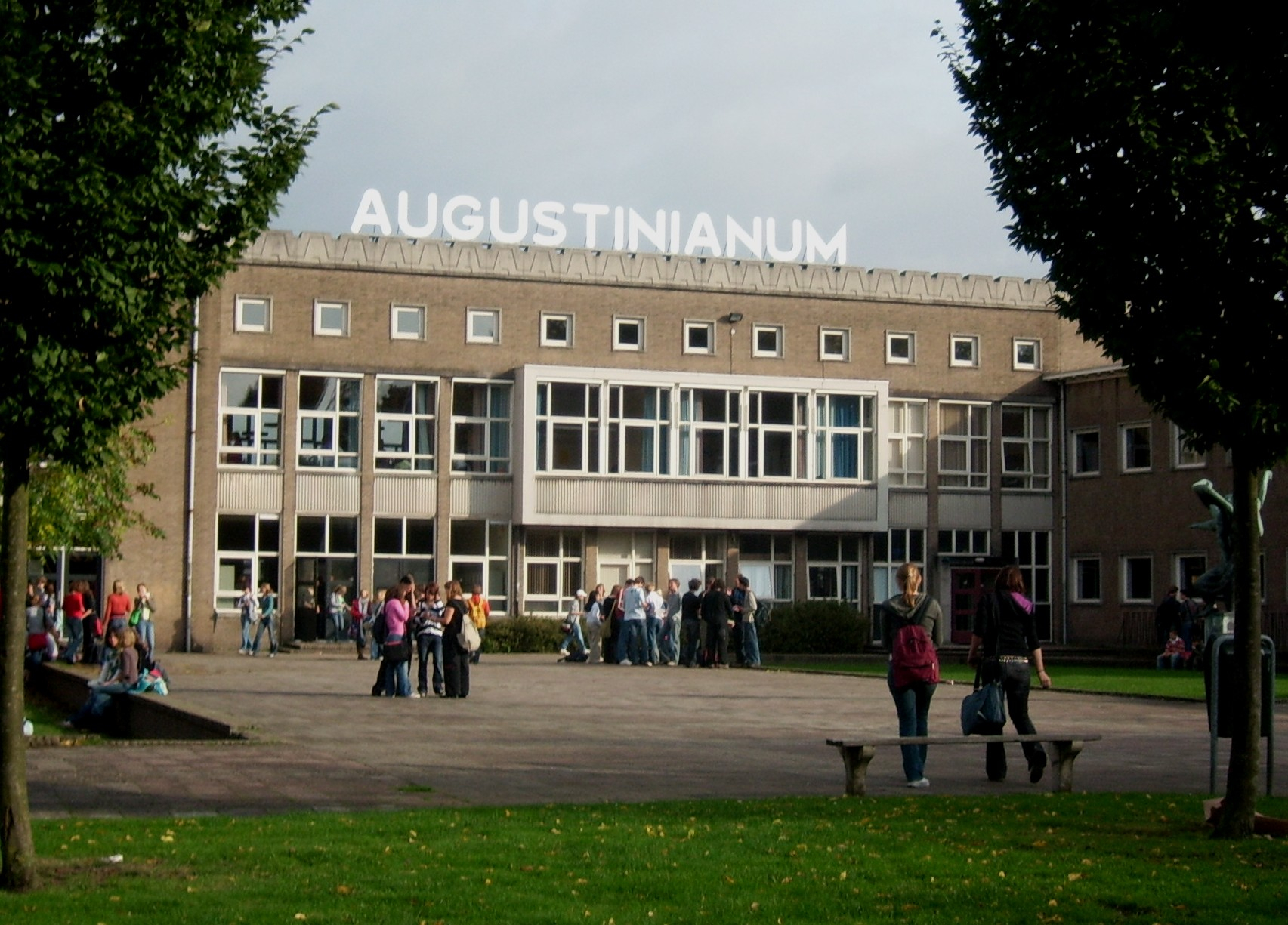
A former school building

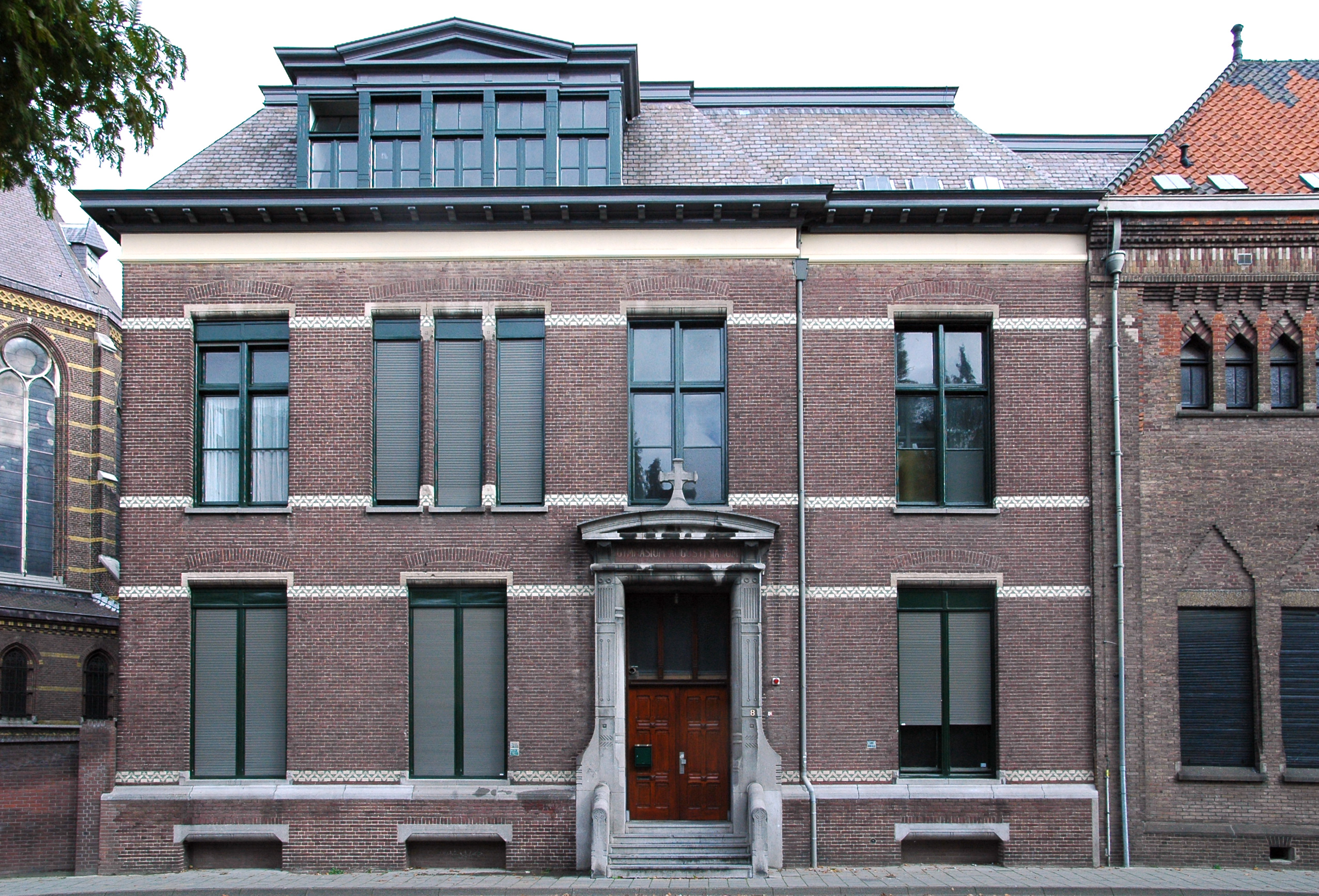
One of the original buildings of the school, 8 Kanaalstraat in Eindhoven. Above the door, the text "Gymnasium Augustinianum" can still be read.

Scholengemeenschap Augustinianum is a secondary school in the municipality of Eindhoven. It offers havo and vwo (Gymnasium).

== History ==
The school first opened on October 3, 1898 by Augustinians in Eindhoven. Back then, the name was Gymnasium Augustinianum, which was changed to Roman Catholic Gymnasium in 1917.

In 1928 the school moved to another convent, which broke all contacts with convent Mariënhage. The activities of the school were moved to yet another building during the Second World War while the convent was in hands of the Germans. After the war it was used as a military hospital as well as a building for victims returning from Germany. Meanwhile, the school was allowed to use a part of the building again.

The school magazine was first released in 1935, when two other school magazines merged into this new one. It was given the name "Primula Veris" by Father Rector Ter Haar:. The magazine had not been released for four years until 2008. A winter edition is now put together.

Because of the steady growth of pupils the school needed to expand, this was however blocked by other plans of city council and it was decided that a new building would be built. Construction began in April 1958; the same year in which the first pupil from a non-rich environment entered the school. This building is not in use anymore and was demolished in 2019. A new building was erected in 2017.

== Recent history ==
The school is generally known as a small school, which for many people is a reason to go to the Augustinianum. However, the past few years have seen an increase in student numbers; the school currently counts well over 1000 pupils, whereas in 2000 it only counted around 800.

Many of its students participated in the pupil strike in November 2007, ignoring lessons starting after 11:00 AM and going to city hall to protest.

== Notable students ==
Former Prime Minister Dries Van Agt was educated here.

== Extra-Curricular activities ==
The school offers several extracurricular activities. The best known is "Augpop", a program in which groups of pupils are guided by a professional musician to form bands. Some of these bands perform quite well locally and have gained popularity within the school. Every year a night in a local cafe (traditionally Cafe Wilhelmina) is organized in which all bands play in front of an audience.

Another music oriented activity is Aug unplugged, with a focus on non-electrical instruments. This started out as a project called Aug Classical but has since become Aug Unplugged, referencing the use of only classical instruments.
