= United World College Maastricht =

Coordinates: 50°50′34″N 05°43′16″E

- Maastricht; Netherlands

Information
- Type: IB World School
- Established: 2009
- Principal: Sannerijn Jansen
- Grades: K-12
- Enrollment: about 950
- Affiliation: United World Colleges
- Website: https://www.uwcmaastricht.nl

The United World College Maastricht (UWCM) is a United World College located in Maastricht, the Netherlands. The school was established in 2009 and moved to a new campus in the Maastricht neighbourhood of Amby in 2013.

== History ==
Established in September 2009, the school originates from a merger of the International School Maastricht and the International Primary School Joppenhof. The school was the 12th member in the family of United World Colleges. In September 2013 the school moved to a new campus in the Maastricht neighbourhood of Amby.

== Principal characteristics ==
UWC Maastricht currently has approximately 900 students between the ages of 2 and 18. They originate from more than 100 countries. The UWC Maastricht community includes 200 international boarding students selected by a worldwide network of about 160 national committees based on personal merit and potential, irrespective of their religion, cultural, political or financial background. The students graduate with the International Baccalaureate diploma, a worldwide accepted university entrance qualification. The college has often attained the highest IB average score amongst IB schools in the Netherlands, with an average of 34 points in 2012.

The school was created as a centre for all the national committee students from Belgium, Germany, and the Netherlands to be the prime example, being around 25 percent of the whole school population. Based on the wide experience of the United World Colleges and the International School Maastricht, the UWC Maastricht will act as a Center for Expertise for Community Services (Expertise Centrum voor Maatschappelijke Stages). This centre will be part of the new college campus and open not only to the UWC, but also to other national schools. The Dutch ministry of education expects the college to act as an example for other Dutch schools.

UWC Maastricht is part of the United World Colleges movement. The Dutch King Willem-Alexander - himself a former UWC Student, having attended UWC Atlantic from 1983 to 1985 - serves as patron of the UWC Organization of the Netherlands; He opened the school in 2013. The President of the International Board, the governing board of the international movement, is Queen Noor of Jordan, while the honorary president of UWC was Nelson Mandela.

== Campus ==
The new campus at Discusworp 65 in Amby opened in 2013. It consists of two school buildings and three dormitories, arranged in a green setting on an 'island' surrounded by a moat and accessible via two bridges. The campus is part of Geusseltpark and is adjacent to a large swimming pool, a football stadium and other sports facilities.

The campus is home to 120 residential students. In total there are around 730 students (23 pre-school students, 263 primary school students, 323 secondary school day students and 120 residential students from around 90 countries.

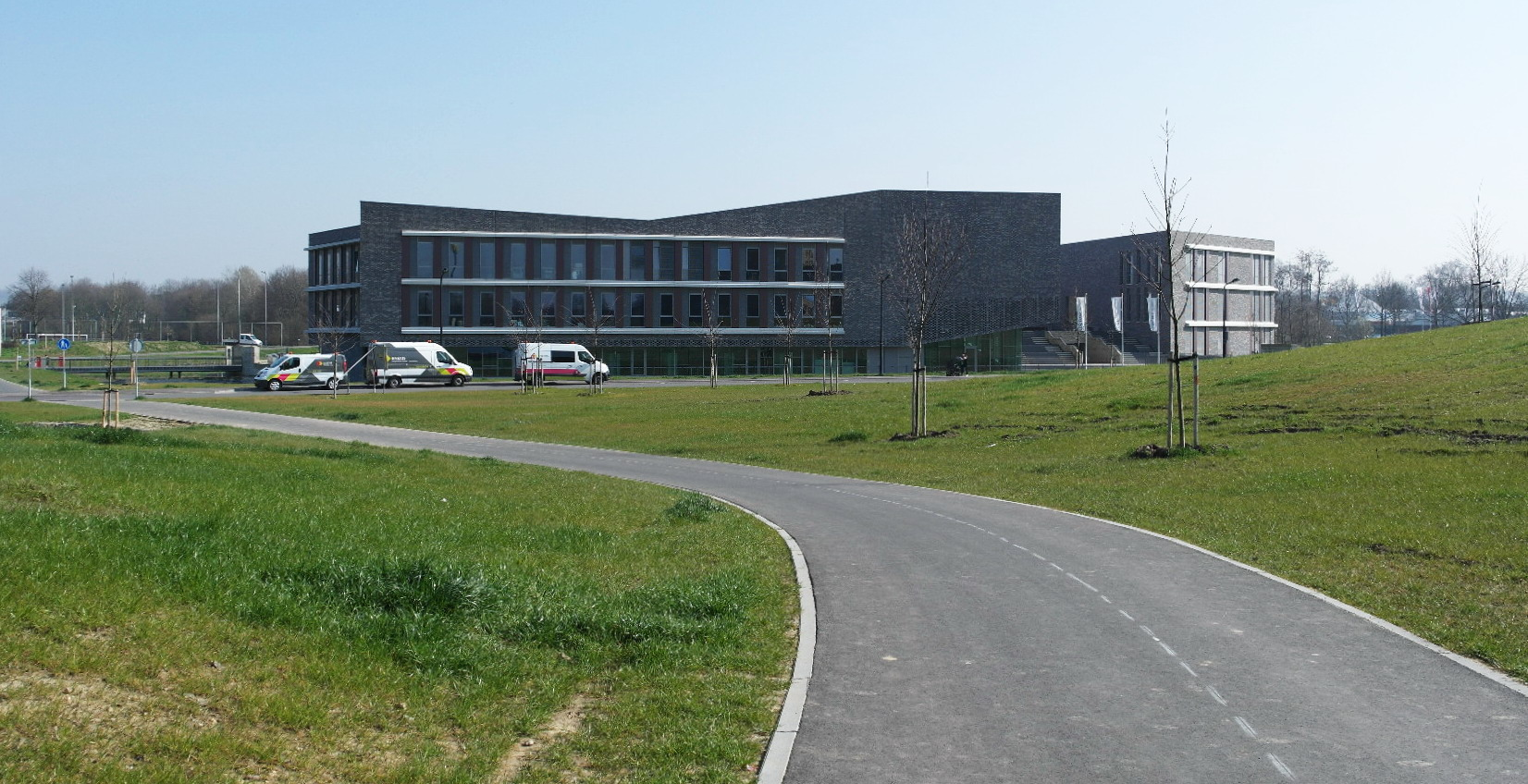
UWCM campus in Amby

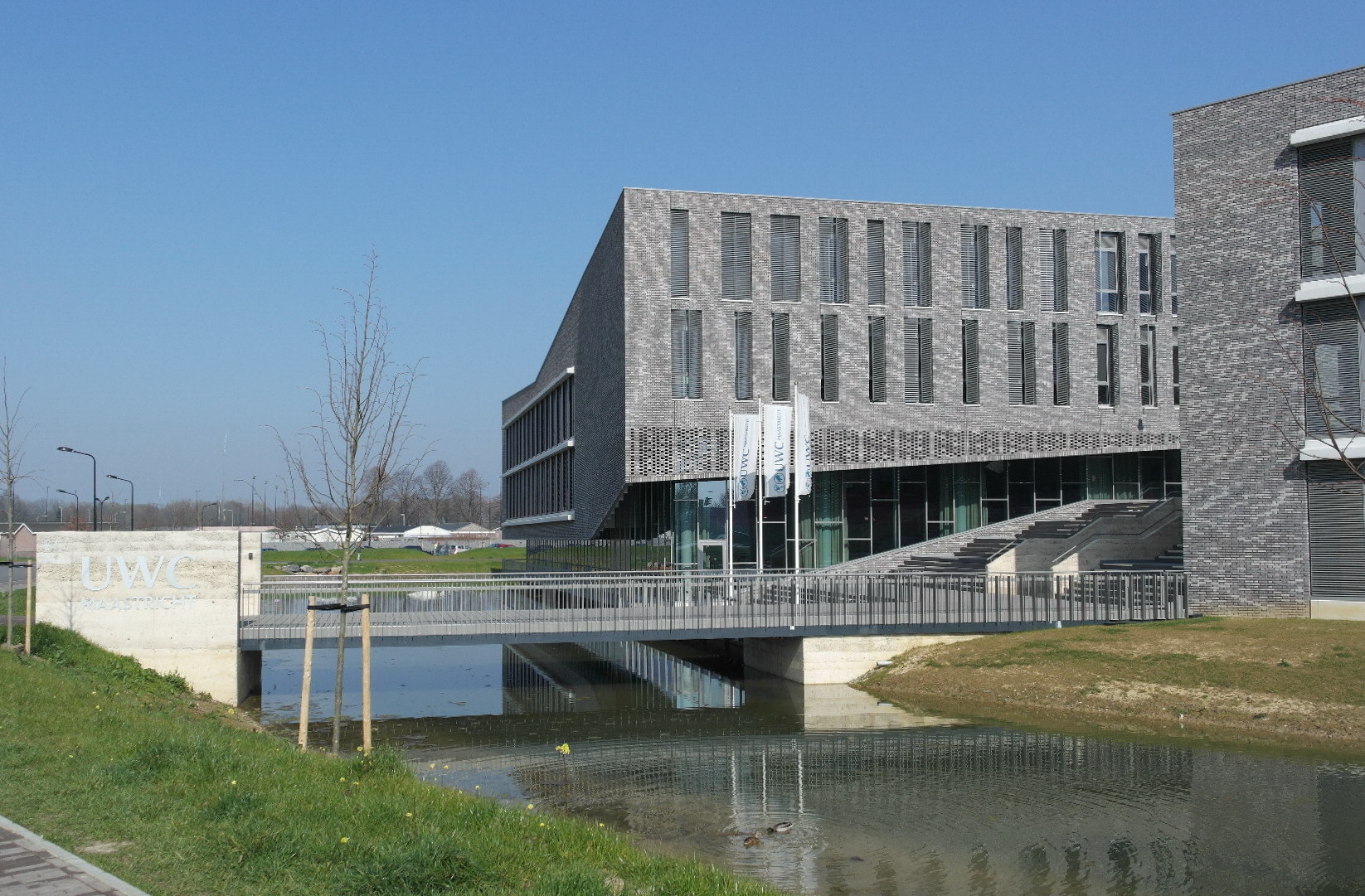
UWCM campus, bridge over the moat

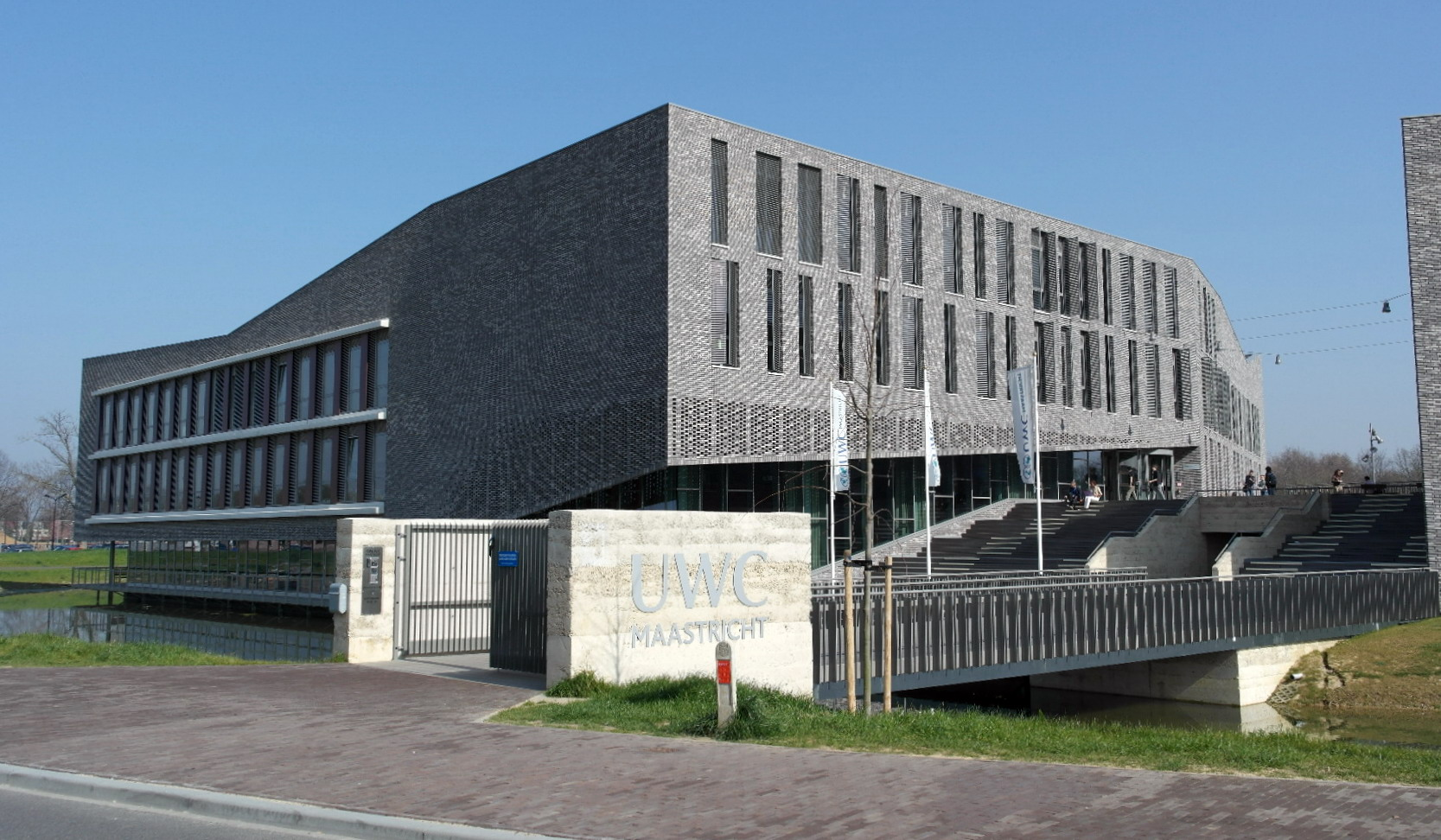
UWCM campus, school building

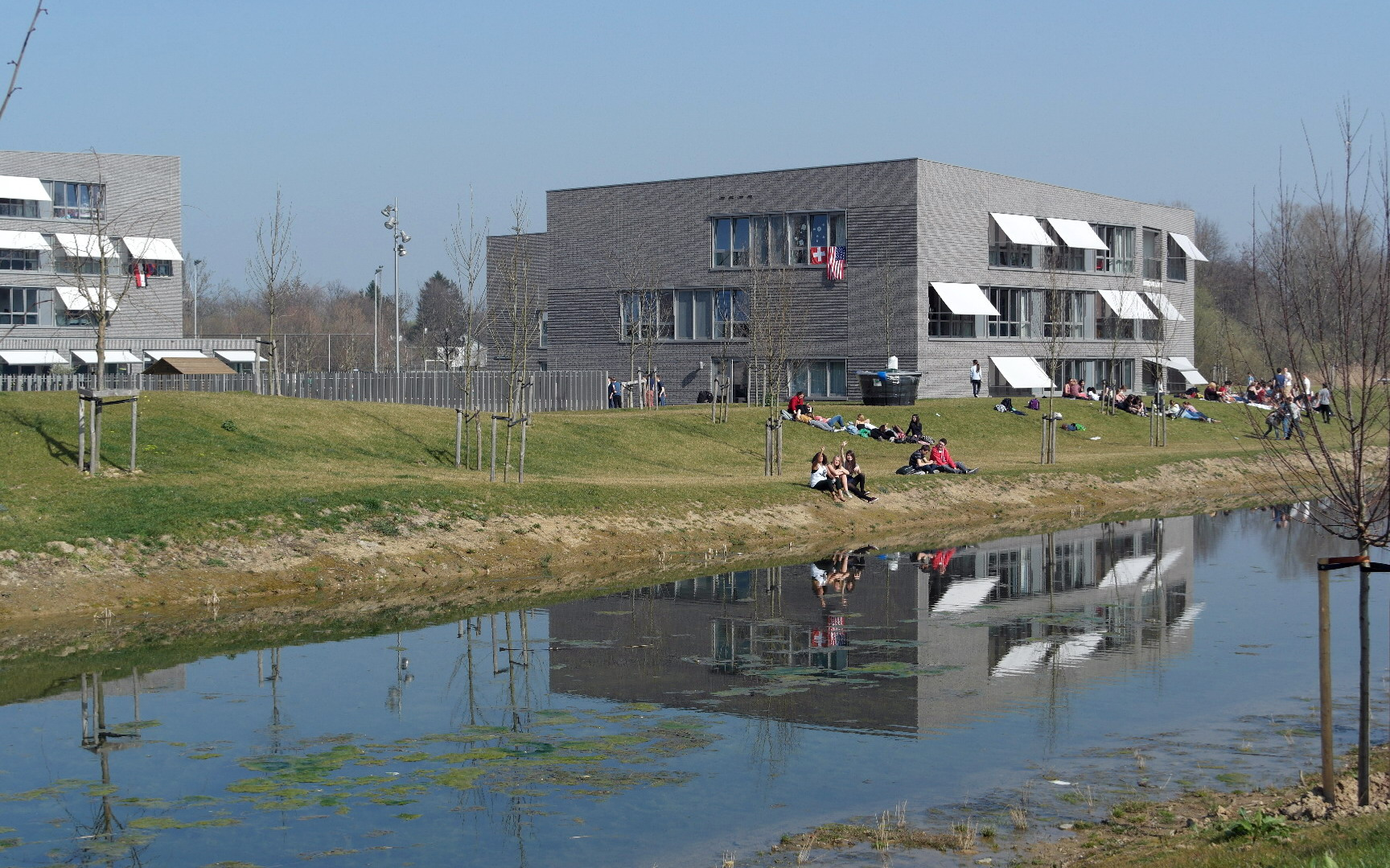
UWCM campus, dormitories
