= Segbroek College =

Secondary school in the Netherlands

Coordinates: 52.0732°N 4.2566°E

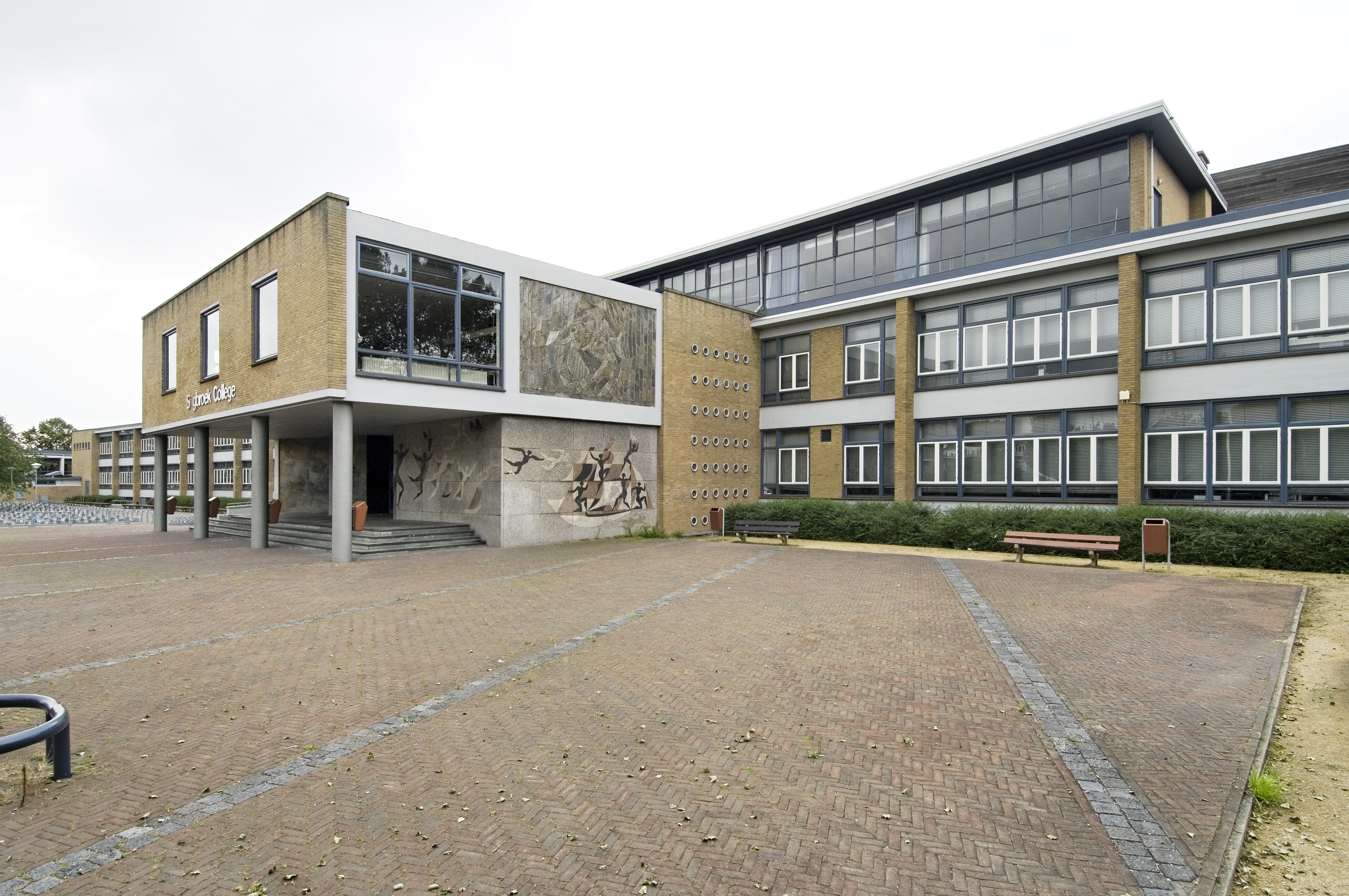

Segbroek College is a secondary school in The Hague, Netherlands. It offers Hoger algemeen voortgezet onderwijs (HAVO, general secondary education), Middelbaar algemeen voortgezet onderwijs (MAVO), and Voorbereidend wetenschappelijk onderwijs (VWO, university preparatory education) coursework.

It occupies the building of the former Grotius Lyceum, a Dutch rijksmonument, which was designed by Stacey Scheper and built in 1949–1955.

== History ==
The Klaverstraat branch was built in 1955 by architect Sam de Jonge for the Grotius Lyceum. The school was one of the last structures to be integrated into the urban planning of post-war The Hague as part of the Sportlaan-Zorgvliet reconstruction plan, designed by Pim de Jonge in 1946.

The striking tableaus at the building's entrance were designed by Hague artist WJ Rozendaal. Sam de Jonge designed the school to be optimized for Dalton education, with dedicated classrooms for each teacher and the option for students to change classrooms between lessons. It also featured a large hall and multiple staircases. Space for independent learning was also provided by work alcoves in the building's corridors. In 1968, a merger led to the creation of the Hugo de Groot School Community, which continued to use the building. Between 1993 and 1998, the building was significantly expanded by Atelier PRO (Leon Thier and Hans Karsen). Two additional building volumes were added, connected by a glass wall. The original building volume was left almost completely intact. Atelier PRO received the School Building Prize (2000) for this project in the "Renovation and Integration" category.
