= Hyperion Lyceum =

Coordinates: 52°23′8.32″N 4°54′21.03″E

Location
- Badhuiskade 361, Amsterdam

Information
- Type: Public Gymnasium and Atheneum
- Denomination: algemeen bijzonder
- Founded: 2011
- Rector: Elly Loman (2018-2023) Joost Termeer (2023-2024) Dick Looyé (2024-)
- Faculty: 32
- Enrollment: ~800
- Website: www.hyperionlyceum.nl

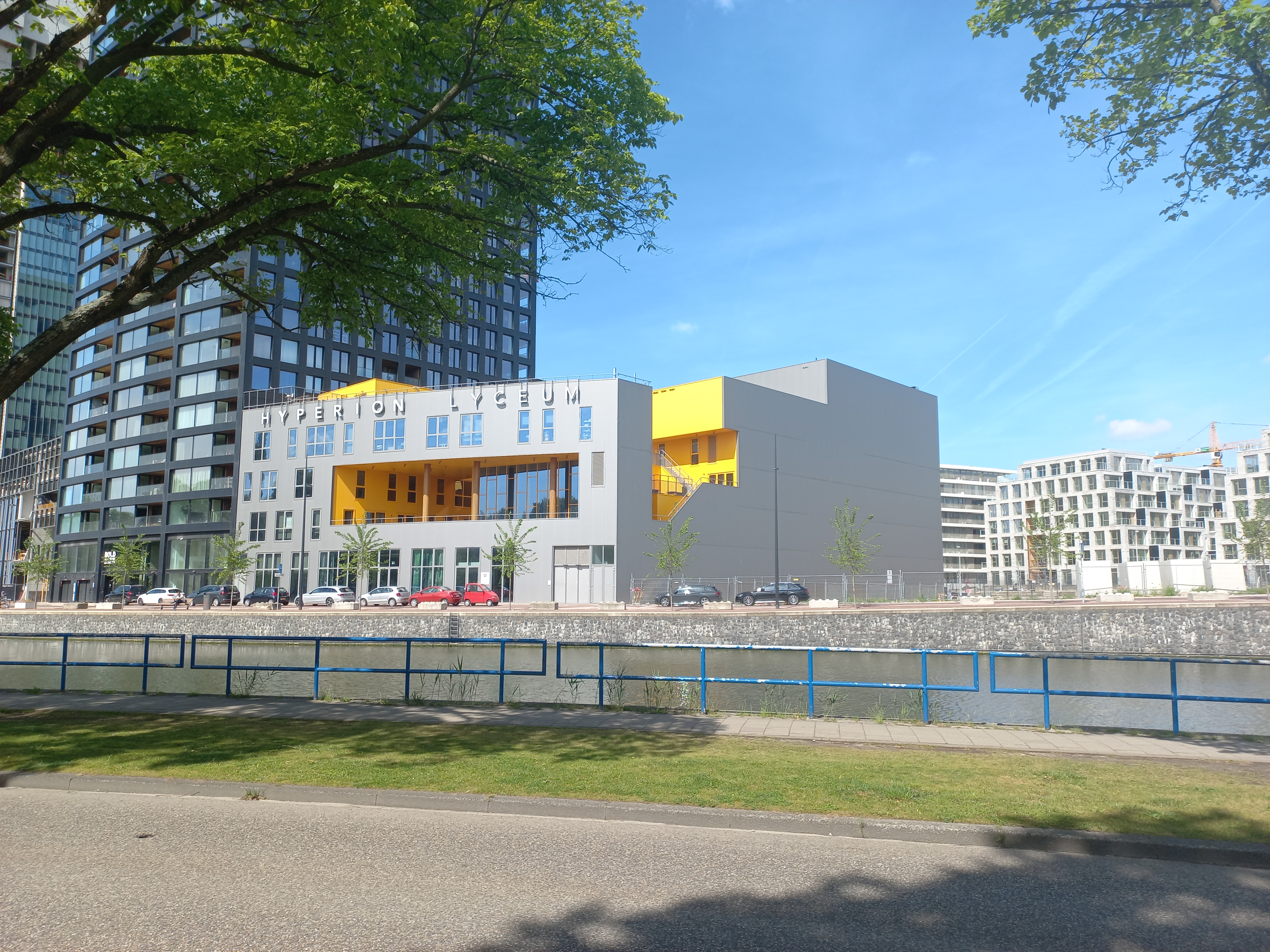
Hyperion Lyceum in may 2022

The Hyperion Lyceum is a secondary school in Amsterdam which offers both gymnasium and atheneum streams. It opened in fall 2011; since 2012 it has been located in Overhoeks in Amsterdam-Noord, in a temporary modular building designed for it by Burton Hamfelt Architectuur. The school is distinguished by using cross-curricular projects for some of the instruction, and offers special courses in great thinkers, lifestyle informatics, drama, and logic and rhetoric. Since 2018 it is located at Badhuiskade 361, Amsterdam-Noord.
