= Oostvaarders College =

Location
- Almere Buiten, Netherlands
- Coordinates: 52.3953°N 5.2654°E

Information
- Type: Middle/high school
- Enrollment: 1500
- Website: Official website

Oostvaarders College, also referred to as OVC, is a school located in Almere Buiten, Netherlands.

In the beginning the Oostvaarders College started as a small school, but became one of the largest middle/high schools in Almere with more than 1,500 students. Oostvaarders College is part of the Foundation ABVO Flevoland, which is a foundation for general secondary education especially in Flevoland.

The school is an official UNESCO school.
