= Schravenlant =

Schravenlant is a high school in the town Schiedam, which is located in the Netherlands. It has about 650 pupils in ages varying from 12 to 18.

Although the school is Dutch there are many nationalities represented within the school.
