= Groenhorst College =

Coordinates: 52°1′6″N 5°39′45″E

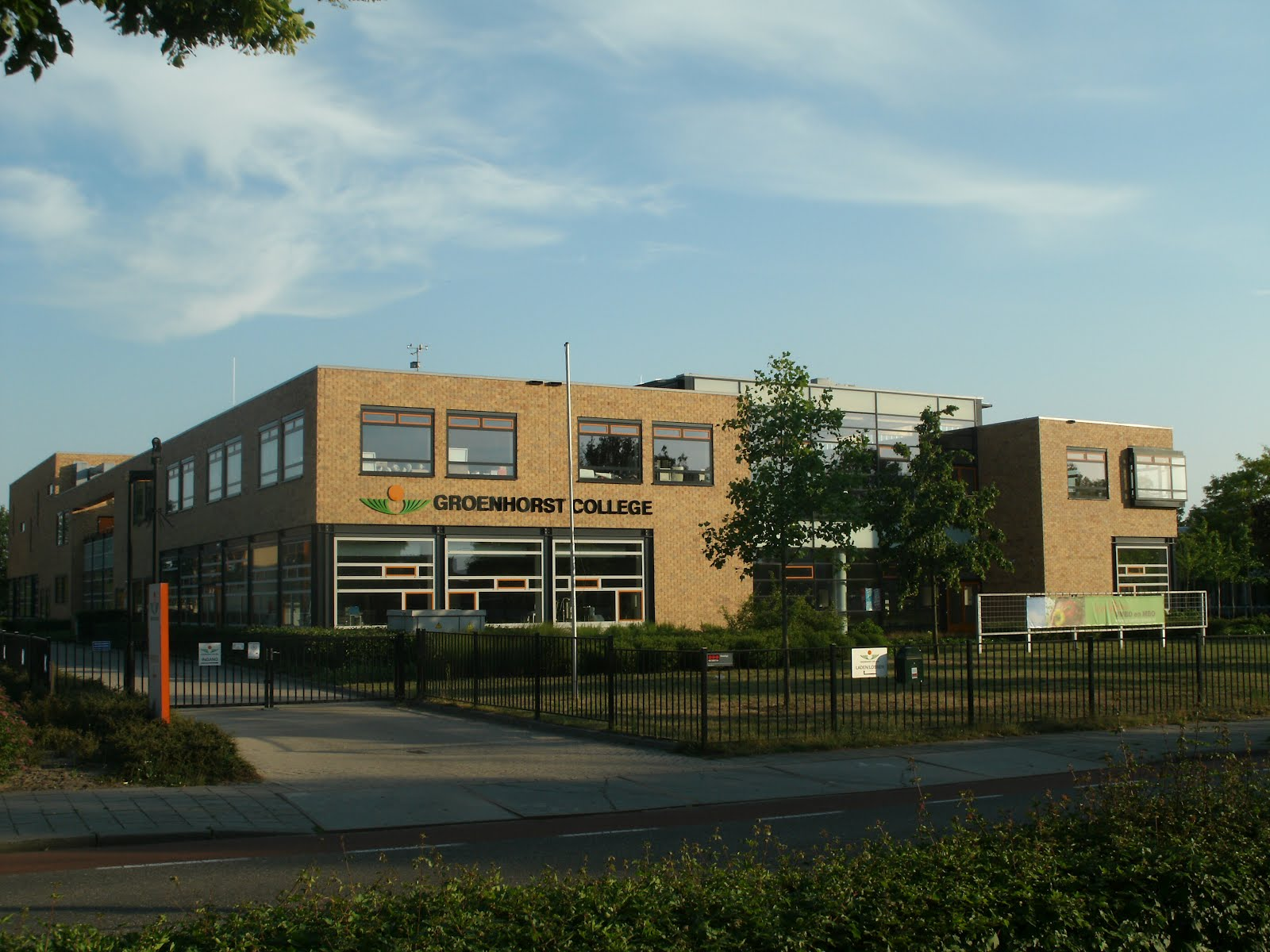
Groenhorst College's Ede location. May 2012

Groenhorst College is an education centre that has 11 locations in the centre of Netherlands: Almere, Barneveld, Bilthoven, Dronten, Ede (2 locations, including the management), Emmeloord (2 locations), Lelystad, Maartensdijk, Nijkerk and Velp. It offers several 'green' high school programmes, apprenticeship programmes on nutrition and nature & environment, education for adults, and several courses.

== History ==
Aeres was formed between 2004 and 2009 through mergers of the former Groenhorst College (now Aeres (V)MBO), the Christian Agricultural College (CAH, now Aeres University of Applied Sciences Dronten), Stoas University of Applied Sciences (now Aeres University of Applied Sciences Wageningen), and PTC+ (now Aeres Tech and Aeres Training Centre). CAH and Stoas merged in 2013 to form Vilentum University of Applied Sciences, creating three faculties in Dronten, Almere, and Wageningen.

In 2020, Aeres merged administratively with Nordwin College. Both organizations formed a single agricultural training center (AOC), followed by an institutional merger in August 2021. Effective with the 2021-2022 academic year, the Nordwin College locations have been renamed Aeres VMBO and Aeres MBO.
