= Karel de Grote College =

Coordinates: 51.8403°N 5.8644°E

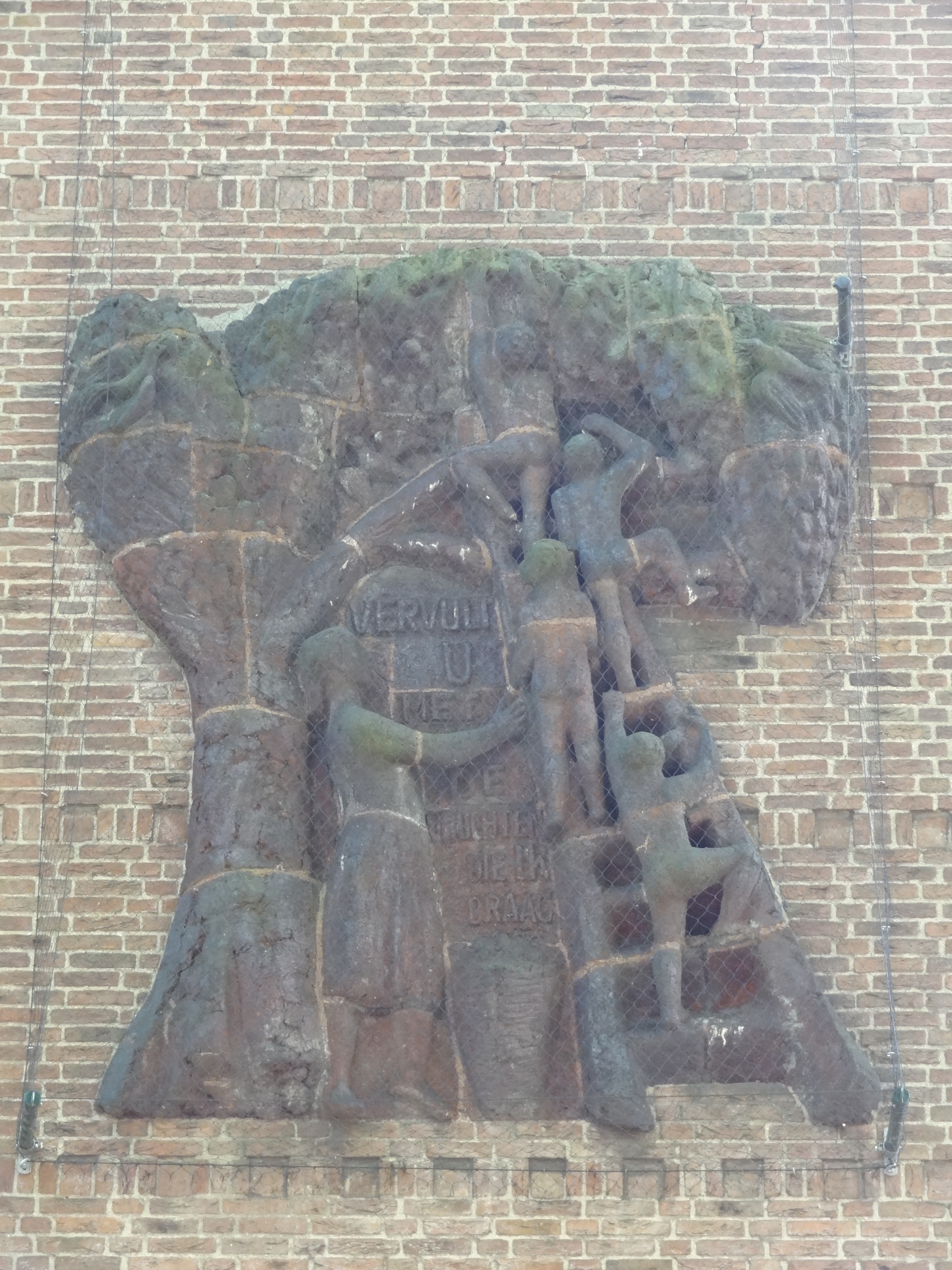
- A relief on the wall of the college
- Nijmegen

Information
- School type: Waldorf/Steiner education
- Principal: A. Aldershof
- Website: http://www.kgcnijmegen.nl

Karel de Grote College is a Dutch Waldorf school named after Charlemagne or Charles the Great, King of the Franks. The school is located near the centre of Nijmegen and has around 750 students, most of whom are from Nijmegen but a large number from outer cities and towns such as Arnhem, Cuijk and Wageningen also find their way to this school.

== See also ==
- List of schools in the Netherlands
- Waldorf education

== Link ==
- Website KGC
