= Markland (surname) =

Markland is a surname of the following people:

- Gene Markland (1919–1999), American baseball player
- George Herchmer Markland (1790–1862), Upper Canada politician
- James Heywood Markland (1788–1864), English solicitor
- Jeff Markland (born 1965), American football player
- Jeremiah Markland (1693–1776), English classical scholar
- Peter Markland (born 1951), English chess player
- Robert Markland (fl. 1659), English politician
- Stuart Markland (born 1948), Scottish footballer
- Ted Markland (1933–2011), American actor
