= Gerben Wynia =

Dutch writer

Gerben Herman Wynia (16 June 1958) is a Dutch literary essayist and biographer.

Being the literary heir of the Dutch poet and novelist C. O. Jellema, he possesses most of the manuscripts and typescripts of the deceased (2003) Jellema. Since then, Wynia published the Collected Poems and the Collected Essays of Jellema. Wynia also published many scientific articles on the writers Simon Vestdijk, Henk Romijn Meijer, Willem G. van Maanen, and Geerten Meijsing. Since 1987, he's the editor-in-chief of the Dutch publishing house Flanor.

Wynia has taught at Bataafs Lyceum in Hengelo.
