= Martinus College =

Secondary school in the Netherlands

Coordinates: 52.692°N 5.218°E

Martinuscollege is a secondary school in Grootebroek in the northwest Netherlands. It combines both lower and upper secondary education under the principle of "2 under 1 roof". All forms of secondary education are available, including LWO (leerwegondersteunend onderwijs), VMBO (voorbereidend middelbaar beroepsonderwijs), HAVO (Higher General Secondary Education), and gymnasium.

The school attracts students from other towns including Andijk, Venhuizen, Wervershoof, Hoogkarspel, Bovenkarspel, Hem, Enkhuizen, Hoorn and Westwoud.

== See also ==
- List of schools in the Netherlands
