= Altra College =

Special education school in North Holland, Netherlands

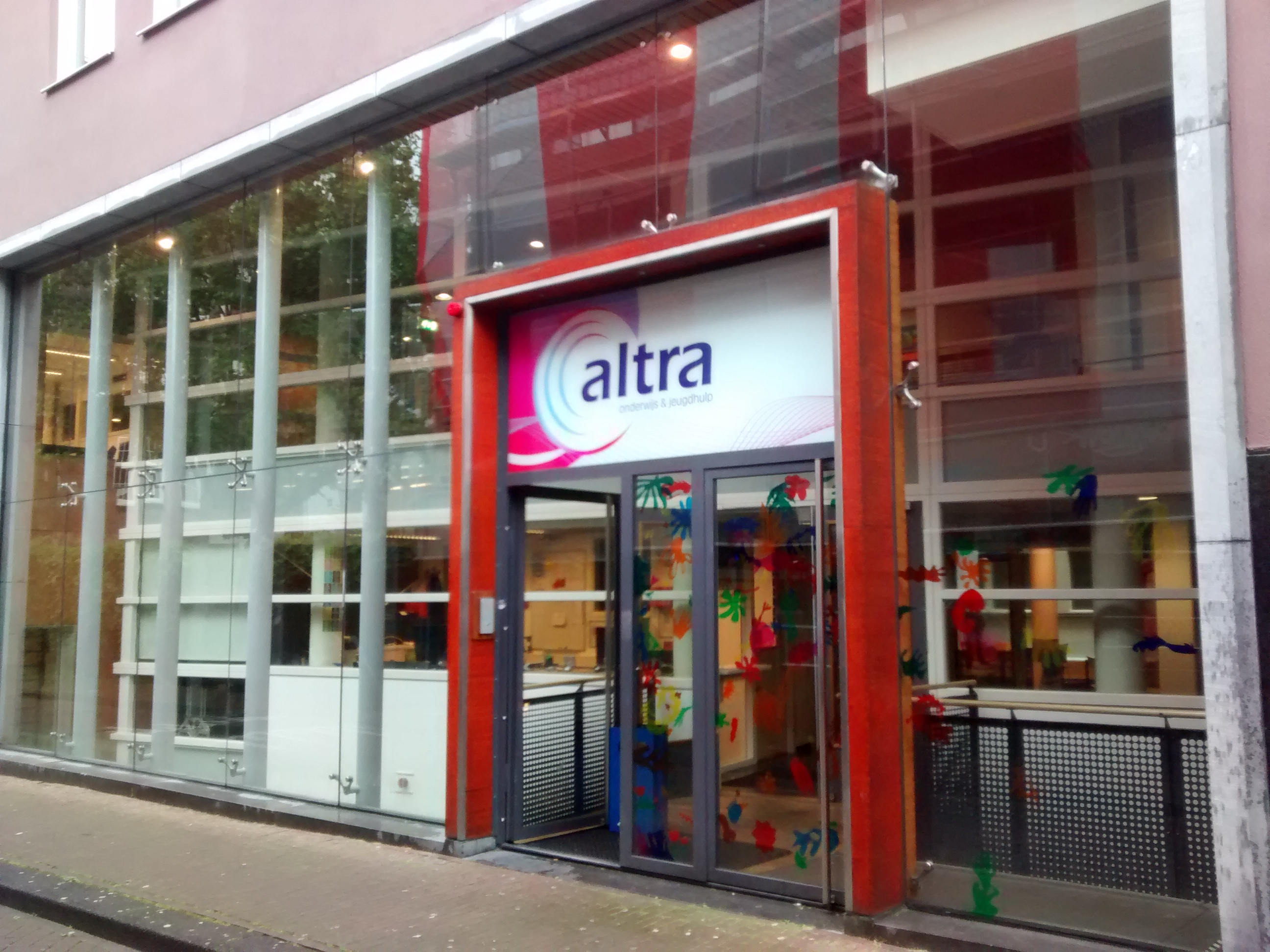
Altra College Centrum

Altra College is a Dutch special education school with branches in Amsterdam, Hoofddorp, Purmerend, and Krommenie. It specializes in teaching children who have problems dealing with fellow students, teachers, or parents, or have psychological problems. Some students get directly enrolled from elementary school, while others follow regular high school for some time.

Notable alumni includes Bilal Wahib.
