= Almere Buiten =

Coordinates: 52.395°N 5.276°E

- Borough of Almere
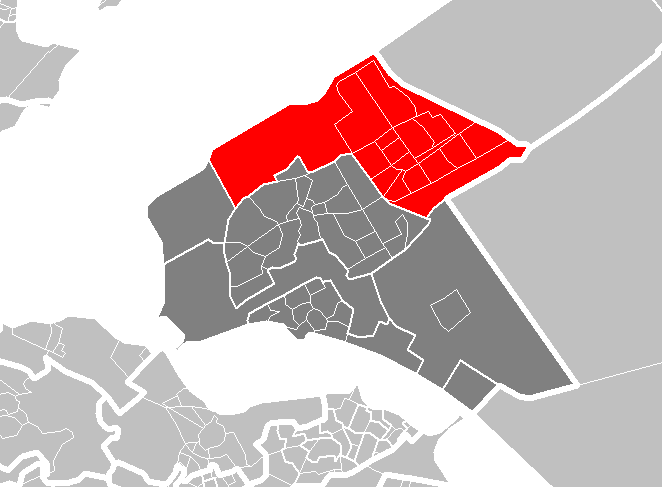
- Country: Netherlands
- Province: Flevoland
- Municipality: Almere

Population
  - Total: 56,040

Almere Buiten is a district in the municipality of Almere in the Dutch province of Flevoland. The district houses 56,760 residents as of 2023.

Almere Buiten is made up of the following neighbourhoods: Bloemenbuurt, Bouwmeesterbuurt, Eilandenbuurt, Faunabuurt, Landgoederenbuurt, Molenbuurt, Oostvaardersbuurt, Regenboogbuurt, Stripheldenbuurt, Seizoenenbuurt, Indischebuurt and Sieradenbuurt. De Vaart, Buitenvaart and Poldervlak are industrial areas.

Almere Buiten also has three secondary schools, Oostvaarders College, Buitenhout College and Montessori Flevoland Lyceum. The Oostvaarders College won the national prize for education in 2007.
