= International School Maastricht =

International School of Maastricht
- Maastricht, Netherlands

Information
- Type: Coeducational
- Principal: Simon Murray
- Enrollment: Approx. 300
- Website: http://www.ismaastricht.nl/

The International School of Maastricht is based in the city of Maastricht in the south of Limburg, Netherlands.

The school shares a building with the Bernard Lievegoed School, a Waldorf school for students of ages 12 to 18. The international school has about 300 pupils from different countries. The ISM is a secondary school that offers education for 7 years. For the first three years, (Form 1–3) students follow a program in preparation for MYP (Middle Year Programme). Next, two following years (Form 4 and 5) cover the MYP programme. Once students reach the age of 16 it is their choice to continue in education as IB (International Baccalaureate) students.

== In scientific research ==
The rooftop of the International School of Maastricht has been used as a location for measuring spectrum occupancy across multiple studies.
