= Markland College =

Coordinates: 51.640777°N 4.606076°E

Location
- Zevenbergen and Oudenbosch; Netherlands

Information
- School type: technical school, school of higher secondary education, pre-university education, high school with classical education
- Website: http://www.markland.nl

Markland College is a school in Oudenbosch and Zevenbergen, Netherlands. It is located in Eikenlaan 18, 4731 CR in Oudenbosch. It also located in Gildelaan 82, 4761 BA in Zevenbergen.
