= Atheneum (school) =

Atheneum, named after the ancient school founded by Roman Emperor Hadrian, is the name used for one of the Benelux educational courses aimed at preparation for scientific education at university with a strong emphasis on academic learning. The Voorbereidend wetenschappelijk onderwijs (VWO) which translates to 'preparatory scientific education', consists of two substreams, the gymnasium and atheneum. The latter does not require finals in Greek or Latin language and culture, unlike the former.

Atheneum is a six-year course. Successful completion allows the candidate to enroll in a bachelor program at a Dutch university. The first three years of Atheneum are the same for every student. During the six years the mandatory subjects are:

- Dutch 4F (language and literature)
- English (language and literature, reading level C1, listening, speaking, writing level B2)
- German (language and literature, reading level C1, listening, speaking B2, writing level B1)
- French (language and literature, reading level B2, listening B2, speaking B1+, writing level B1)
- Physical education
- Social studies (4th year)
- Arithmetics 3F
- Biology (until 3rd year)
- History (until 3rd year)
- Geography (until 3rd year)
- Cultural and artistic education (4th year)

Apart from these mandatory subjects, there are some extra subjects that are mandatory in line with the chosen profile, within the last three years of Atheneum. There are four profiles a student can choose: Nature and Technology (NT), Nature and Health (NG), Economy and Society (EM), Culture and Society (CM).

Nature and Technology has the extra mandatory subjects:

- Mathematics (B)
- Physics
- Chemistry
- One subject of choice out of the subjects appointed by the general administrative order.

Nature and Health has the extra mandatory subjects:

- Mathematics (A or B)
- Biology
- Chemistry
- One subject of choice out of the subjects appointed by the general administrative order.

Economy and Society has the extra mandatory subjects:

- Mathematics (A or B)
- Economy
- History
- One subject of choice out of the subjects appointed by the general administrative order.

Culture and society has the extra mandatory subjects:

- Mathematics (A or B or C)
- History
- One cultural subject of choice
- One society subject of choice

In the third year a student makes the following decisions apart from their choice in profile:

- They may choose between French or German as a second modern language they want to study for the last three years of Atheneum.
- They choose one of the variants of Mathematics:
  - A: Analytical, probability and statistic.
  - B: Analytical, geometry, algebra and formulae.
  - C: A simpler form of mathematics A.
  - D: More difficult Math B combined with extra subjects from A (This version is not taught in every Atheneum)
