= Voorbereidend wetenschappelijk onderwijs =

Dutch education program

Voorbereidend wetenschappelijk onderwijs (VWO, meaning "preparatory scientific education" in Dutch), also often referred to as Voortgezet Wetenschappelijk Onderwijs (meaning "Secondary Scientific Education" in Dutch) is the highest variant in the secondary educational system of the Netherlands, attended by approximately a fifth of all Dutch high school students. After leaving primary or elementary school students are enrolled in different types of secondary schools, according to their academic ability. The course is a six-year course and successful completion allows the candidate admission to Dutch universities. The VWO is therefore a matriculation exam.

The VWO includes the so-called Gymnasium variant, which differs from the regular VWO variant (also called Atheneum) in that it has Latin and/or Classic Greek as an additional, compulsory part of the curriculum (some schools offer additional courses as well). A few schools offer only the Gymnasium variant, called 'Categoriaal Gymnasium'. Of all VWO students, around a quarter follow gymnasium, accounting for approximately 5–6% of all Dutch high school students.

== Specialization ==
Prior to 2001, students had to choose at least 7 out of roughly 14 (options varied by school) topics on which they would ultimately take the national examinations. Dutch and a modern foreign language—most often, but not necessarily, English—were the two compulsory topics, with five topics open for choice, which students picked according to their ability and interest. Students in the Gymnasium substream had to take at least one classical language (Ancient Greek, Latin). For others, the most commonly chosen topics included English, French, German, physics, biology, mathematics (applied "A" and advanced "B"), chemistry, history and economics (macro and micro). Less common topics were Spanish, Russian, West Frisian, Italian and philosophy.

Since the 2001 'Phase II' reforms of Dutch secondary education, candidates have to specialize in one or more of four 'profiles' at the start of their fourth year of study in the VWO. They contain a fixed set of topics which form a less fragmented study course to offer students a better and more holistic preparation for their university studies.

An addition to the Phase II is the Technasium program, in both VWOs (Atheneums and Gymnasiums), acting as sort of a fifth profile. It was originally designed to give students a look into the world of technology oriented professions and is based around research and design, called O&O (Dutch: Onderzoek & Ontwerpen). Students work together in groups on assignments from actual companies and contests as diverse as designing a building, proposing a product involving solar energy or even developing a plan for the gentrification of an area. For the last two years, the school no longer acts as a contact person, and students must approach companies to find an assignment. The course is finished with a "meesterproef", literally a proof of mastery in which the students spend 160 hours a person on a project.

In Phase II, all students are required to participate in the following courses: Dutch, English, mathematics (there are four different courses in mathematics: A/B/C/D), Latin or Ancient Greek/an additional foreign language (Gymnasium students are not required to take an additional foreign language other than English), PE (in Dutch: bewegingsonderwijs or lichamelijk onderwijs), ANW (General Nature Sciences, only in the fourth/fifth year, depending on the school), CKV (a general form of culture and art education in the Atheneum stream) or KCV (classical cultural education in the Gymnasium stream, similar to CKV, except from the fact that it focuses on the classical aspect) and "Maatschappijleer" (only in the fourth year, similar to social sciences). The content of some subjects has also changed: economics has become a total subject, instead of variations between economics 1 (macro) or 2 (micro), similar to the fact that students no longer have to choose between French 1 or 2 and German 1 or 2 but instead take French and German as whole subjects. On top of these subjects the students have to choose a study profile. The profiles are sets of classes that prepare for future studies. Each profile has a set of fixed and optional classes that can be chosen from.

The four profiles are:

- Cultuur en Maatschappij (C&M) (literally, "culture and society") emphasizes history, arts, and foreign languages (French, German and less frequently Spanish, Russian, Arabic, Hebrew and Turkish). Students specializing in this profile are required to choose an extra foreign language and have to choose between mathematics A and C. Mathematics C is a simplified version of mathematics A, focusing on stochastics and in a lesser extent on statistics. This profile prepares for artistic and cultural training at university.
- Economie en Maatschappij (E&M) (literally, "economy and society") emphasizes history and economics. Students specializing in this profile are required to choose between mathematics A and B, as mathematics C does not give access to economics programs. Mathematics B focuses on algebra and geometry, and sometimes mathematics A and B share content of the taught material, albeit mathematics A is a slightly simplified version of mathematics B in these cases. This profile prepares for economics training at university.

Students specializing in the first two profiles are required to take history and in the second profile economics is also required. There are more optional additional courses in the first two profiles than in the last two profiles. The number of optional additional courses varies per school. Additional languages are considered to be part of the first profile, while geography and philosophy can be applied to both profiles.

- Natuur en Gezondheid (N&G) (literally, "nature and health") emphasizes biology and natural sciences. This profile requires biology and chemistry classes. Students can choose between mathematics A and B, but B is recommended, as Physics (optional) and Chemistry require knowledge of this. This profile is necessary to attend medical training at university. It should however be noted that to study medicine physics is a required course in the Netherlands, and a "natuur en gezondheid" profile with physics and mathematics B doubles as a "natuur en techniek" one.
- Natuur en Techniek (N&T) (literally, "nature and technology") emphasizes natural sciences. The mathematics B classes focus on algebra and geometry. This profile is necessary to attend technological and natural science training at university and to attend medical school.

The latter two profiles strongly overlap, so that it is possible to technically specialize in both profiles depending on the student's choice of optional topics. Students specializing in Natuur en Gezondheid can do this by choosing mathematics B and adding physics to their curriculum; students specializing in Natuur en Techniek can do this by adding biology. The main difference between the third and fourth profile is (depending on the school) the possibility to take economy/geography/philosophy in combination with the N&G profile, or mathematics D/NLT (Nature, Life and Technology) with the N&T profile. It is possible to combine courses, which is quite common.

Profiles can be combined as well, for instance Natuur en Techniek with additional biology doubles as Natuur en Gezondheid. Therefore, the four profiles are often put into two groups, the M-line for the first two profiles listed and the N-line for the last two listed.

Students can also choose to do an extra additional course. For instance, a student taking Natuur en Techniek can attend a third foreign language if the school has sufficient facilities to do so or studies it in his spare time and participate only in the mandatory examinations. A student can choose to discontinue that subject, at all times.
