= Voorbereidend middelbaar beroepsonderwijs =

Pre-vocational secondary education track in the Netherlands

Pre-vocational secondary education (Dutch: Voorbereidend middelbaar beroepsonderwijs, pronounced [ˈvoːrbəˌrɛidənt ˈmɪdəlbaːr bəˈrupsˌɔndərʋɛis], lit. 'preparatory middle-level vocational education', abbr. VMBO) is a school track in the Netherlands. It lasts four years, from the age of twelve to sixteen. It combines vocational training with theoretical education in languages, mathematics, history, arts, and sciences. Sixty percent of students nationally are enrolled in VMBO. VMBO has five different levels; in each a different mix of practical vocational training and theoretical education is combined:

- Theoretical programme (theoretische leerweg, VMBO-T) is the most theoretical of the four. It prepares for middle management and vocational training at the MBO level of secondary education and it is needed to enter Hoger algemeen voortgezet onderwijs (HAVO). It is also known as MAVO.
- Combined programme (gemengde leerweg) is in between the theoretical and middle-management-oriented paths.
- Middle-management vocational programme (kaderberoepsgerichte leerweg) teaches theoretical education and vocational training equally. It prepares for middle management and vocational training at the MBO level of secondary education.
- Basic vocational programme (basisberoepsgerichte leerweg) emphasizes vocational training and prepares for the vocational training at the MBO level of secondary education.
- Practical education (Praktijkonderwijs) consists of mainly vocational training. It is meant for pupils who would otherwise not obtain their VMBO diplomas. After obtaining this diploma pupils can enter the job market without further training.

For all of these levels there is "learning path supporting education" (Leerweg Ondersteunend Onderwijs), which is intended for pupils with educational or behavioural problems. These pupils are taught in small classes by specialised teachers.

== See also ==
- Education in the Netherlands
