= Hoger algemeen voortgezet onderwijs =

Stream of secondary education in the Netherlands and Suriname

Hoger algemeen voortgezet onderwijs (Dutch pronunciation: [ˈɦoːɣər ˈɑlɣəmeːn ˈvoːrtxəˌzɛt ˈɔndərˌʋɛis], lit. 'higher general continued education', acronym: havo [ˈɦaːvoː]) is a stream in the secondary educational system of the Kingdom of the Netherlands and Suriname. It has five grades and is generally attended at ages of 12 to 17. It provides access to the hogeschool-level (polytechnic) of tertiary education.

The first three years are the Basisvorming (literally "basis formation"). All pupils follow the same subjects: languages, mathematics, history, arts and sciences. In the third year, pupils must choose one of four profiles. A profile is a set of different subjects that will make up for the largest part of the pupil's timetable in the fourth and fifth year. It is called the Tweede Fase (literally "second phase"). A profile specialises the pupil in an area, and some studies therefore require a specific profile. Students must also choose one to three additional subjects. Furthermore, Dutch and English, as well as some other subjects, are compulsory. In all profiles except Cultuur en Maatschappij (literally "culture and society), mathematics is compulsory, but what is done for mathematics is different depending on if the student chose mathematics Alpha which focuses primarily on statistics or Beta which focuses primarily on algebra. There's a choice between Alpha and Beta for all profiles other than "Natuur en Techniek" where Beta is required. In addition to this, there's also the elective Mathematics Delta which serves as an expansion on Mathematics Beta. Pupils still have some free space for electives, which is not taken up by compulsory and profile subjects. They can pick two subjects from other profiles. Sometimes, pupils choose more than two subjects, which can result in multiple profiles.

== See also ==
- Education in the Netherlands
- Voorbereidend middelbaar beroepsonderwijs (vmbo)
- Voorbereidend wetenschappelijk onderwijs (vwo)
