= Pelican Latin American Library =

The Pelican Latin American Library (PLAL) was a specialist series of books published by Penguin Books UK in the 1970s. The series was inaugurated in the wake of the success of another Penguin imprint, the Penguin African Library. The general editor of the series was Richard Gott, the longtime Latin America correspondent of the Guardian.

The series took off at a time when Latin American politics was buffeted by numerous challenges such as military dictatorship, American hegemony, widespread poverty, and guerrilla uprisings often inspired by Marxist liberation theology. The first book in the series was Carlos Marighela's For the Liberation of Brazil, translated by John Butt and Rosemary Sheed. Other titles published in the series were:

- Alain Labrousse, The Tupamaros
- Alain Gheerbrant, The Rebel Church in Latin America
- Andre Gunder Frank, Capitalism and Underdevelopment in Latin America
- Camilo Torres Restrepo, Revolutionary Priest
- Carlos Marighela, For the Liberation of Brazil
- Che Guevara, Guerrilla Warfare
- Fidel Castro, Fidel Castro Speaks
- Francisco Julião, Cambão - the Yoke: The Hidden Face of Brazil
- Gerrit Huizer, Peasant Rebellion in Latin America
- Jean-Pierre Bernard et al., Guide to the Political Parties of South America
- John Womack Jr., Zapata and the Mexican Revolution
- Marcel Niedergang, The Twenty Latin Americas, vols 1 and 2
- Miguel Arraes, Brazil: The People and the Power
- Paul Gallet, Freedom to Starve
- Regis Debray, Revolution in the Revolution?
- Regis Debray, Strategy for Revolution
- Richard Gott, Rural Guerrillas in Latin America
- Sven Lindqvist, The Shadow: Latin America Faces the Seventies
- Thomas Melville and Marjorie Melville, Guatemala – Another Vietnam?
- Victor Daniel Bonilla, Servants of God or Masters of Men?
- Salvador Allende, Chile's Road to Socialism

Due to the perception of leftist bias in the series, there was friction with the corporate owner Pearson Longman and the imprint was eventually ceased.
