= St Stanislas College, Delft =

St Stanislas College
- Dutch: Stanislascollege
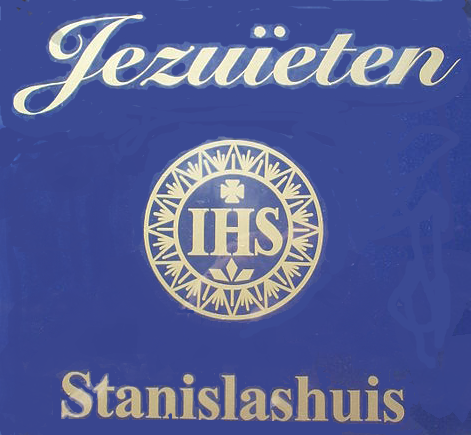

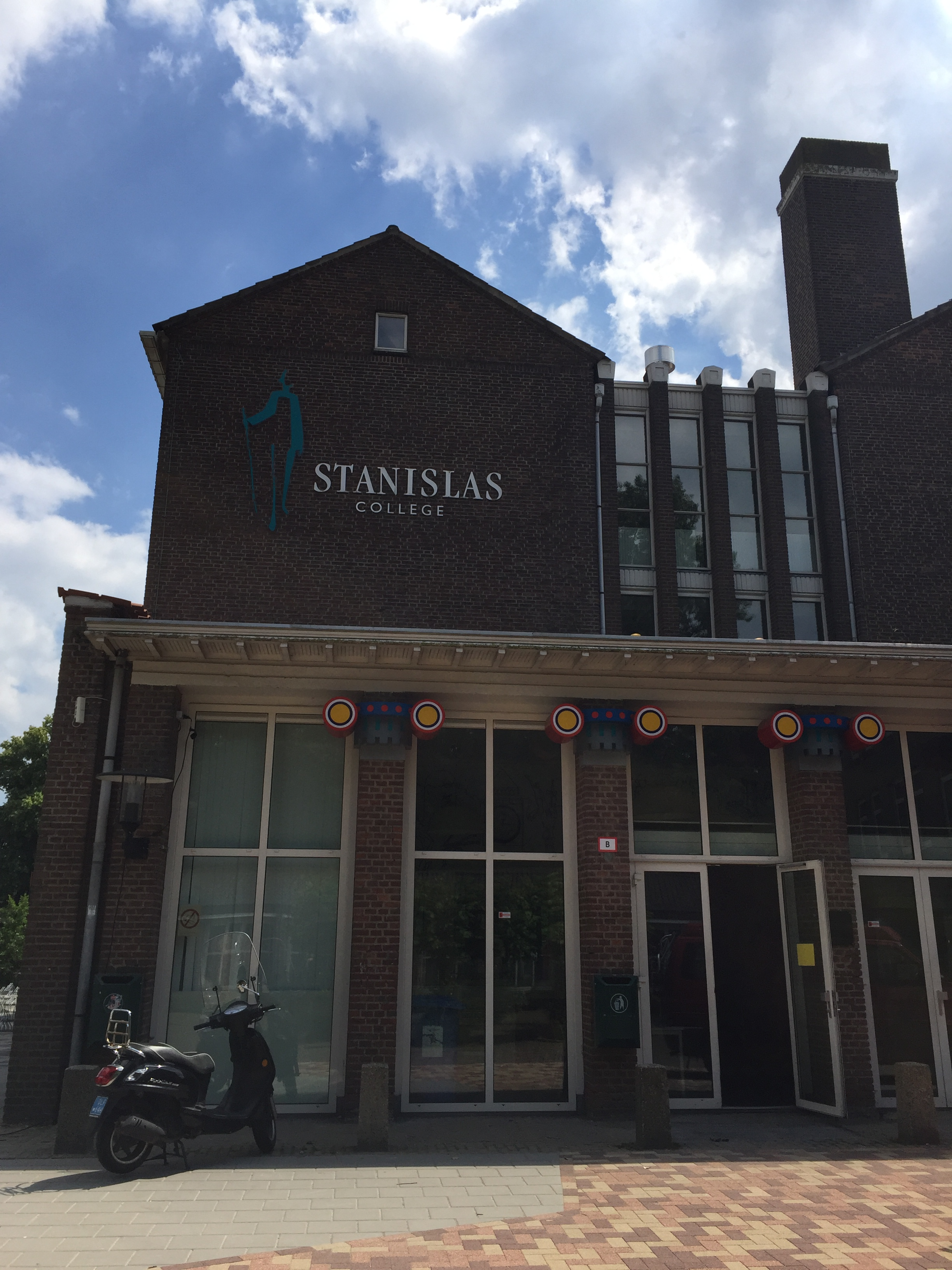

Location
- Delft, Pijnacker, and Rijswijk, South Holland; Netherlands; 52°00′31″N 4°20′43″E

Information
- Type: Private secondary school
- Religious affiliation: Catholicism
- Denomination: Jesuits
- Patron saint: Stanislaus Kostka
- Established: 1948; 78 years ago
- Founder: Society of Jesus
- Affiliation: Lucas Education Foundation
- Website: www.stanislascollege.nl

St Stanislas College (Dutch: Stanislascollege) is a conglomerate of private Catholic secondary schools located in Delft, Pijnacker, and Rijswijk, in the province of South Holland, in the Netherlands.

Saint Stanislas College itself was founded in Delft as a Gymnasium in 1948 by the Society of Jesus. When other surrounding schools needed to work together to secure funding they joined to form a conglomerate. In 2007, there were 4,253 students. It is the third largest school in Delft, after the Christian Lyceum Delft and Grotius College. The college is part of the international network of Jesuit schools.

== History ==
When the college was founded, it was one of seven Jesuit schools in the Netherlands. The others were: St Willibrord College in Katwijk, which became Catholic Comprehensive School, Breul; Ignatius Gymnasium in Amsterdam; Maartenscollege, Groningen; Aloysius College, The Hague; and Canisius College, Nijmegen. The group had the acronym 'WIMACS'. In the 1980s and 1990s, with the exception of St Stanislas College, control of the schools was transferred to the local government, and because of mergers with other conglomerates, eventually those other schools lost their affiliation with the Jesuits.

== Locations ==
The conglomerate has seven schools:

- Westplantsoen in Delft is the main location where Saint Stanislas College was founded by the Jesuits. Lessons there are taught at the Hoger algemeen voortgezet onderwijs (HAVO) and Voorbereidend wetenschappelijk onderwijs (VWO) levels. It has about 1800 students.
- Reinier de Graafpad teaches the Voorbereidend middelbaar beroepsonderwijs (VMBO) and the HAVO for the first three years. After taking the HAVO, students can transfer to another secondary school. It has approximately 750 students.
- Krakeelpolderweg teaches the VMBO and has about 440 students.
- Pijnacker teaches the VMBO, HAVO, and VWO and has about 1250 students.
- Lodewijk Makeblijde College in Rijswijk has been part of the organization since 2008.

== Chapel ==
St Stanislas Chapel (Dutch: Sint Stanislaskapel) is outside the front entrance to the college. The foundation stone was laid on 21 June 1955. It was consecrated on 13 November 1956, the anniversary of St Stanislas, by the Bishop of Rotterdam, Martinus Jansen. The architect of the chapel, which was designed in the style of the Bossche School, was Jan van der Laan.

== Notable alumni ==
- Hans van Heijningen (graduated 1972), Socialist Party politician
- Peter Tetteroo (graduated 1981), journalist
- Theo Verbey (graduated 1977), composer
- Jessie Jazz Vuijk (graduated 2011), model

== Gallery ==
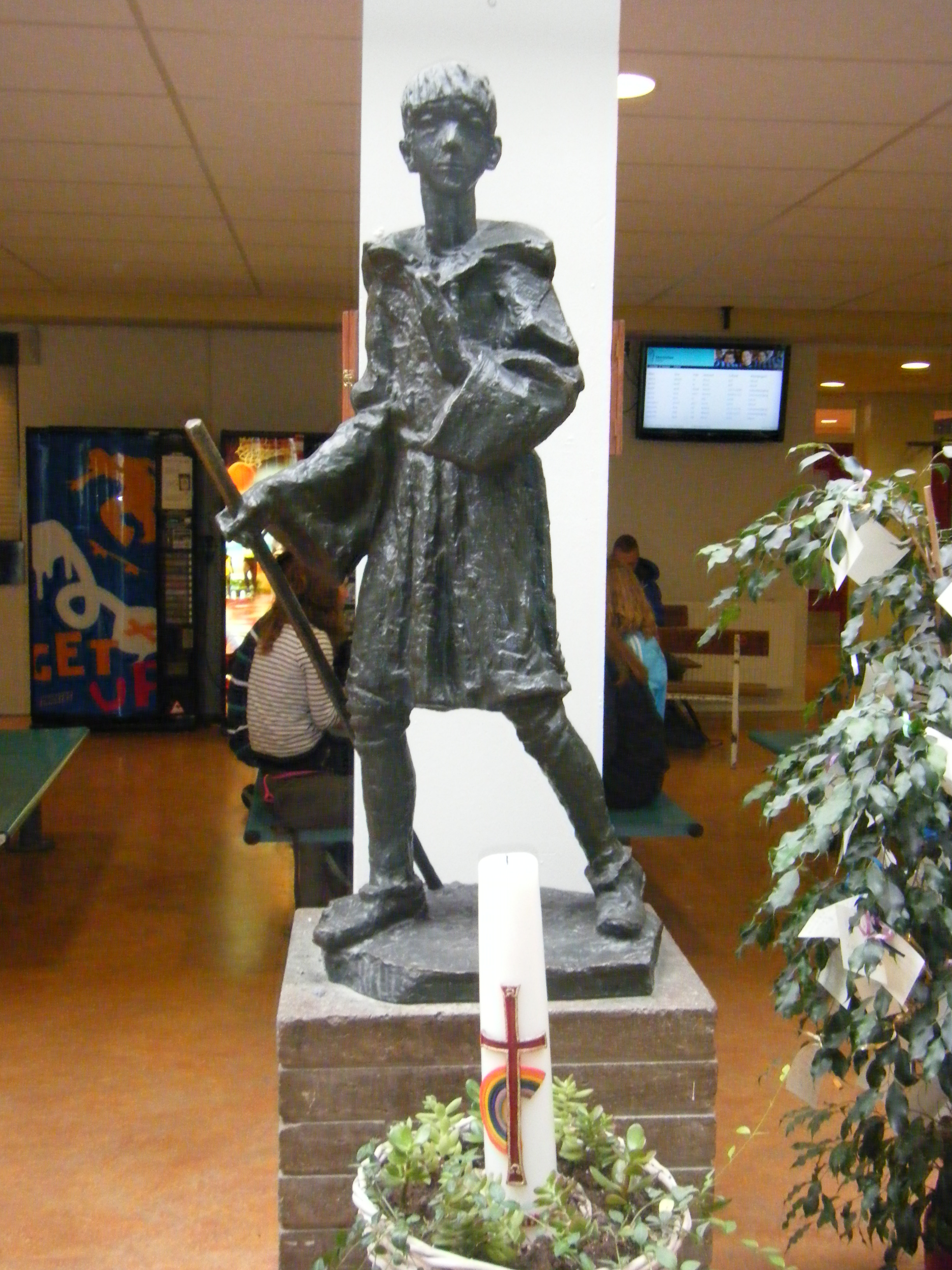
Statue of Stanislaus Kostka by Albert Termote

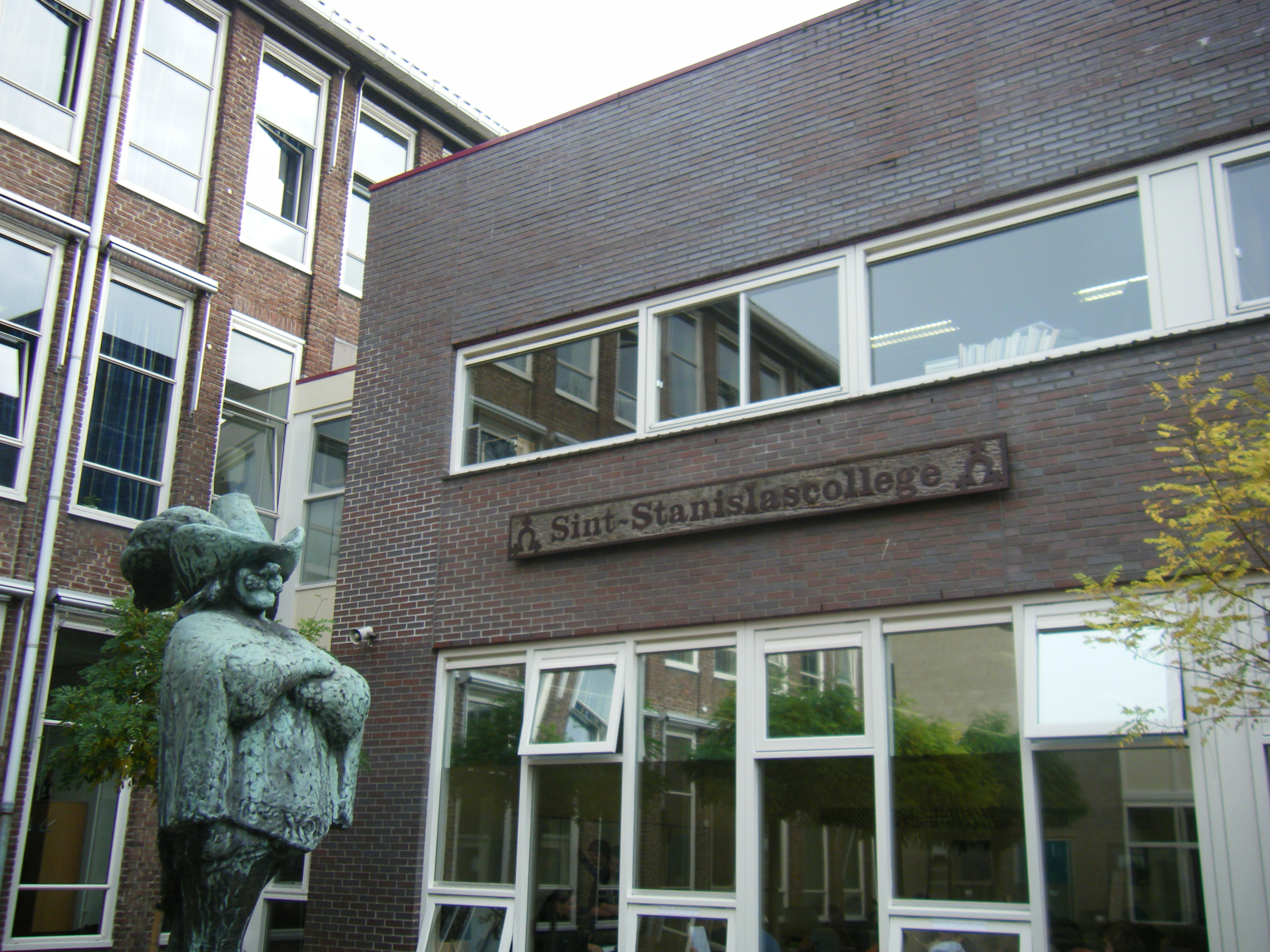
Statue of Cyrano Bergerac by Arie Teeuwisse

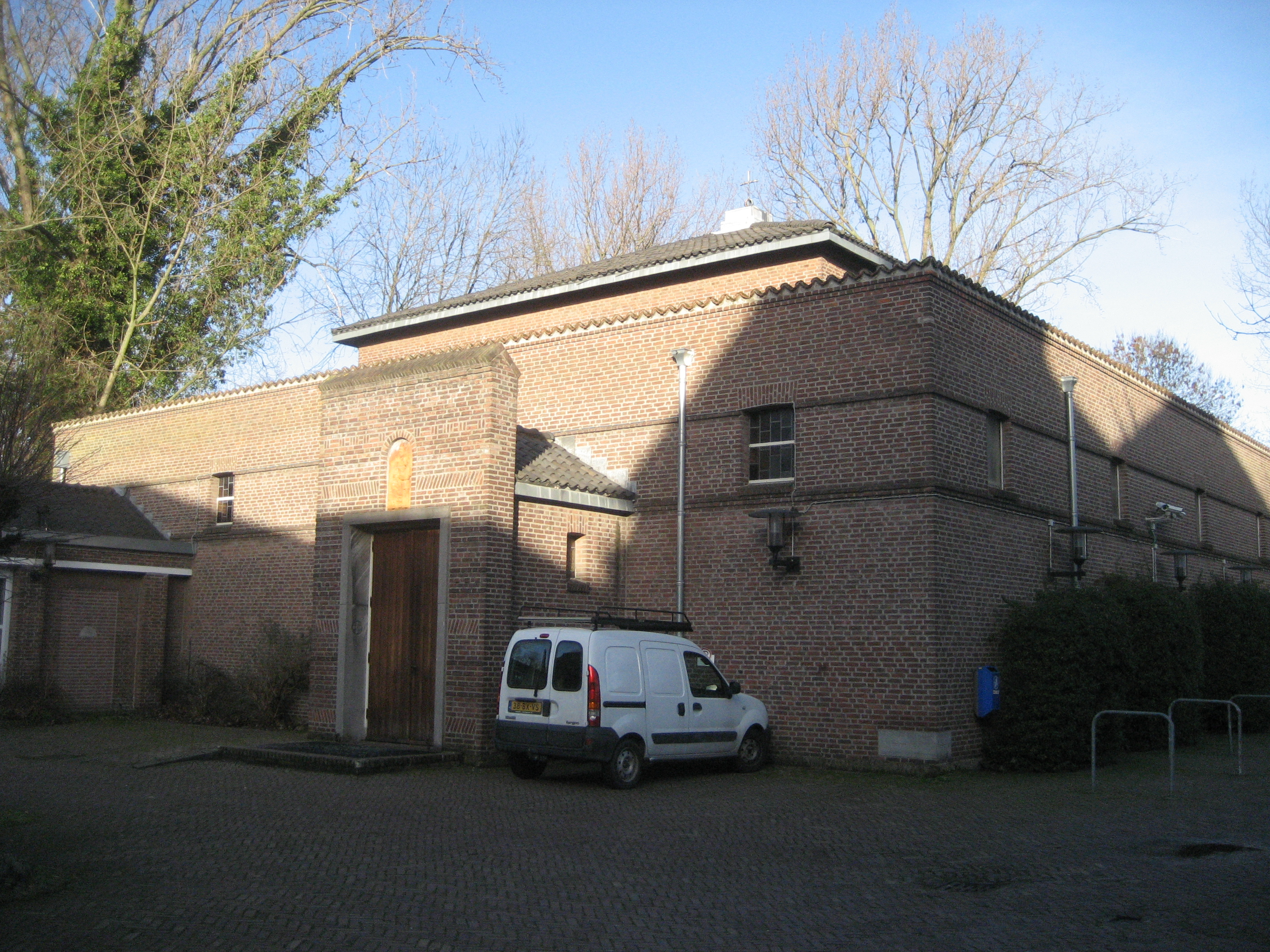
Chapel near the Stanislascollege

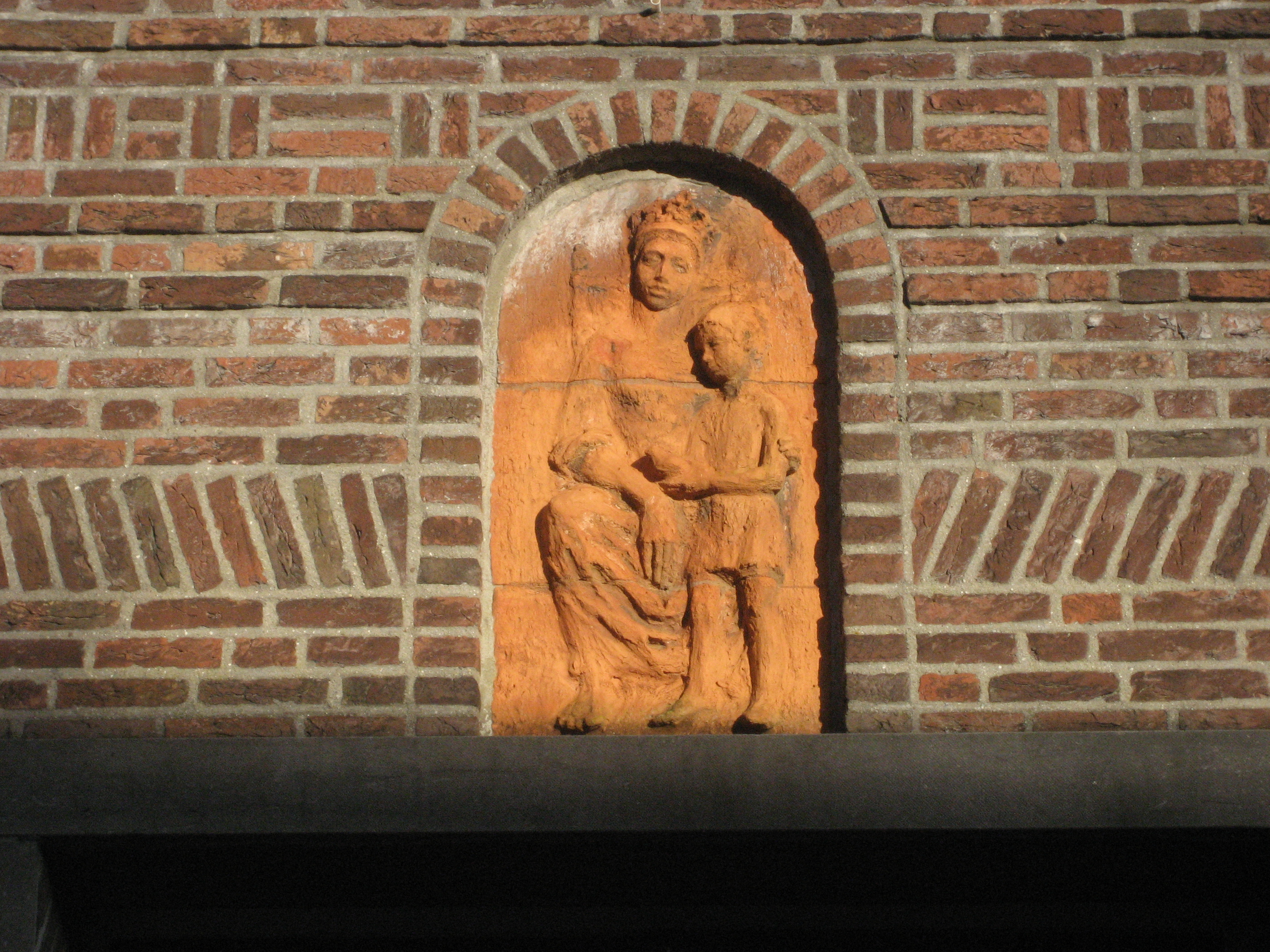
Sculpture above the entrance of the college chapel

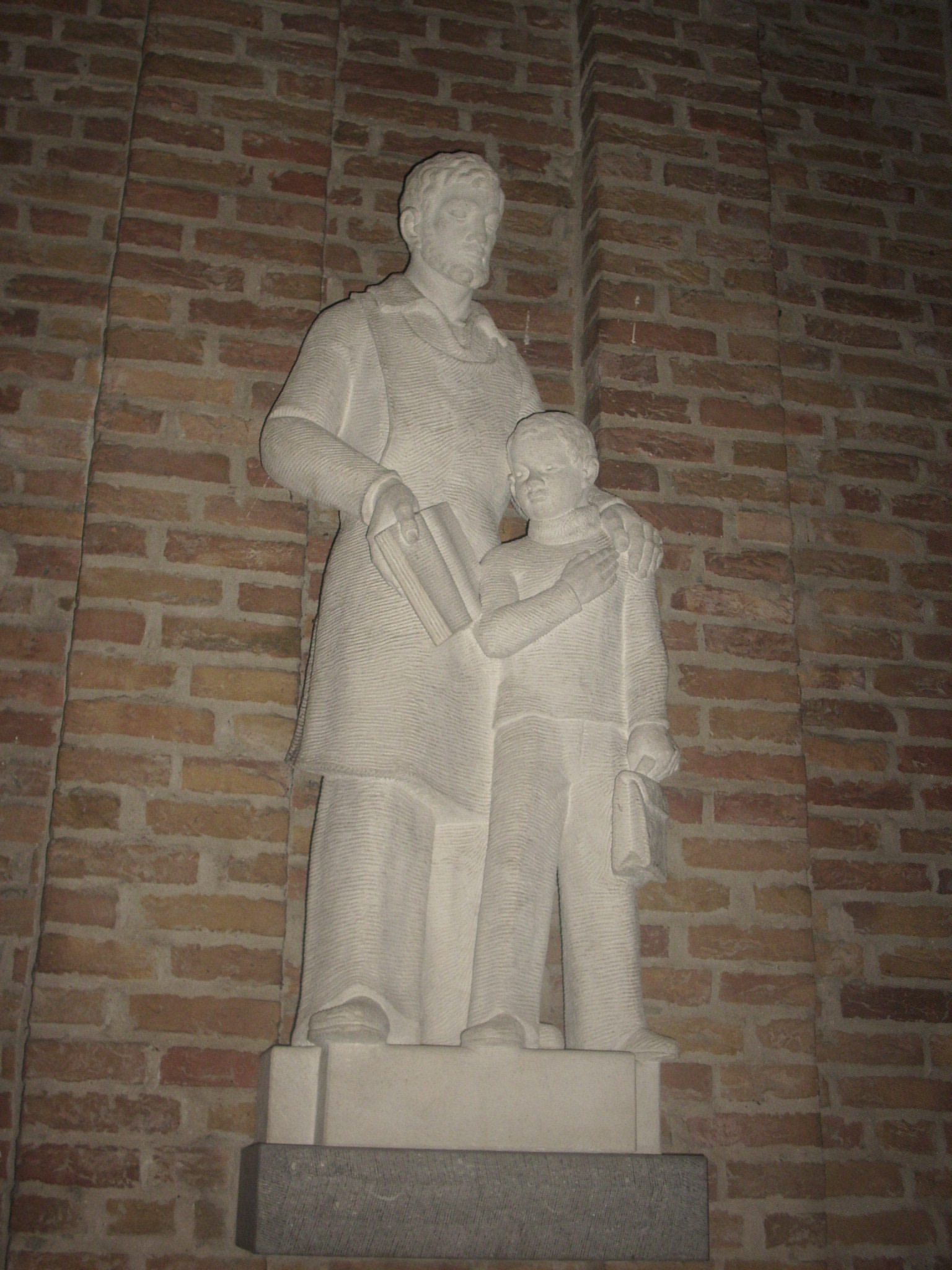
Statue of St Joseph in the college chapel

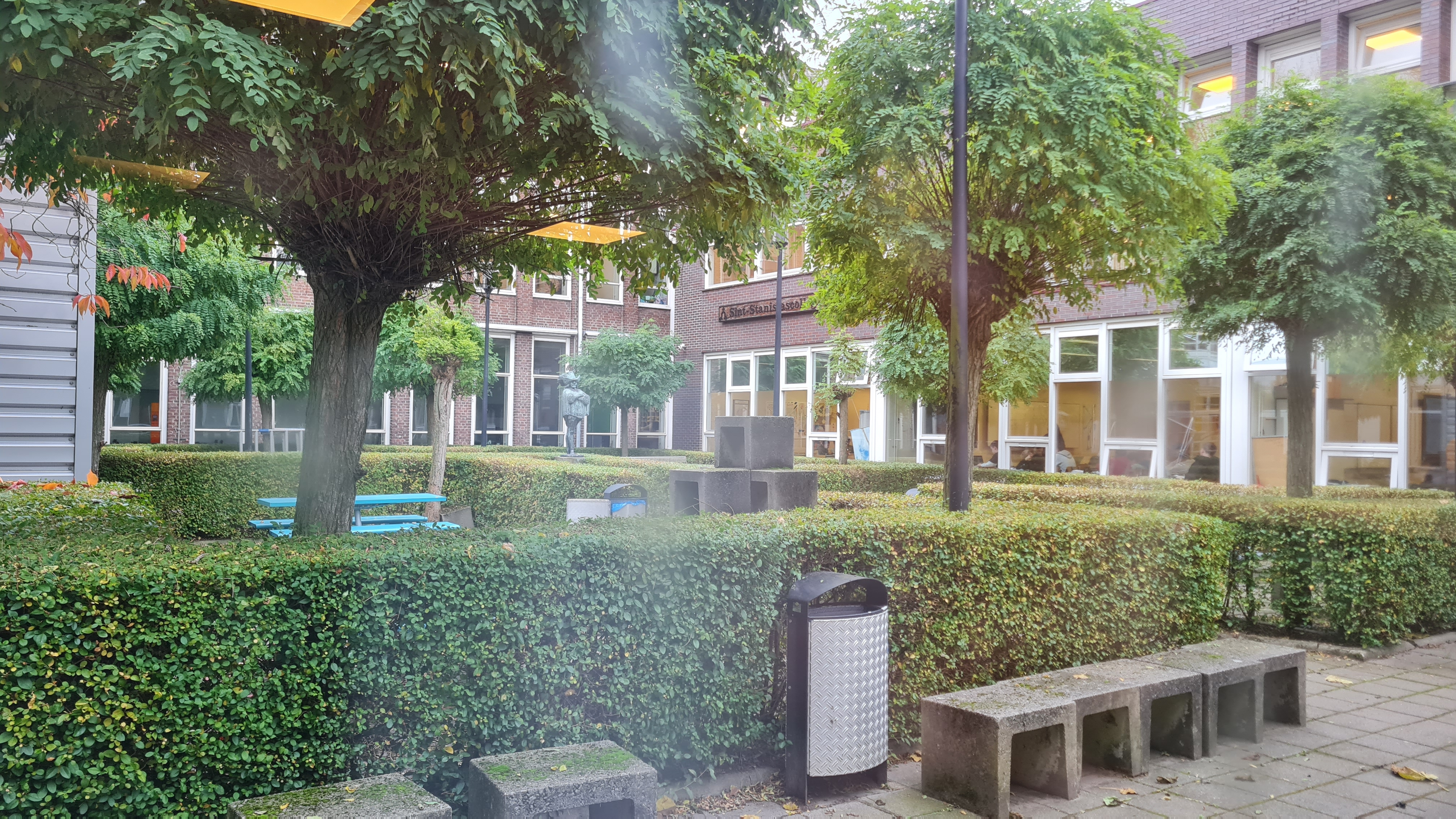
The courtyard

== See also ==
- Education in the Netherlands
- List of Jesuit schools
- List of Jesuit sites in the Netherlands
