= Alejandro Cueva Ramírez =

Colombian writer and scholar

Alejandro Cueva Ramírez is a Colombian writer and scholar. He was born in Leticia in 1950. He studied at the Universidad Pedagógica Nacional de Bogotá, and now teaches literature in Leticia. He has written the biography of Liborio "Leticiano" Guzmán, regarded as "el más grande futbolista amazonense" or the best footballer to emerge from Colombia's Amazonas region. He has also written plentifully about arts and culture in the Amazonas, for example, on the work of the Colombian writer Victor Daniel Bonilla in the region.

== Works ==
- Liborio Leticiano Guzmán: nuestro héroe de Eldorado del fútbol profesional colombiano
- Los versos del Liceo Orellana o los hermanos de La Salle en Leticia, 25 años
- Festival de la Confraternidad Amazónica
- Pacho Chulito Vela, el maestro y artista
- Don Alejo o Trapito, el rey de los feos
