= Hans van Heijningen =

Dutch politician (born 1953)

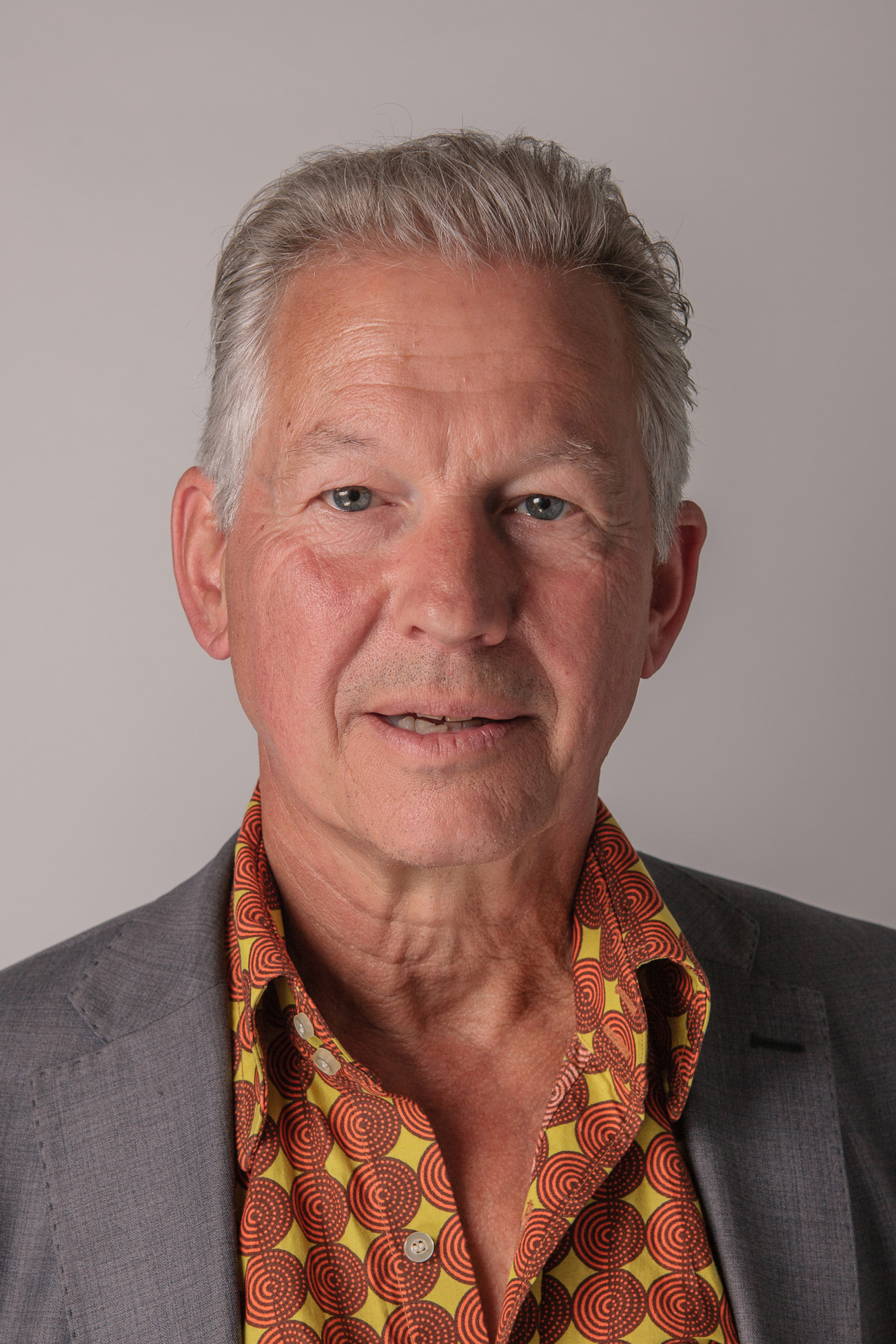
- van Heijningen in 2012

Secretary of the Socialist Party
- In office 20 June 2005 – 20 January 2018
- Preceded by: Paulus Jansen
- Succeeded by: Lieke Smits (acting)

Personal details
- Born: 15 March 1953 (age 73) Naaldwijk, Netherlands
- Party: Socialist Party

J.G.C. (Hans) van Heijningen (born 15 March 1953) is a Dutch politician. He was the party secretary of the Socialist Party (SP), a position comparable to the post of chairman in other parties. Before holding this office, Van Heijningen was a foreign policy advisor to the SP whose areas of responsibility included European politics, and development cooperation.

== Biography ==
Van Heijningen attended high school at the Stanislas College in Delft and, from 1972 to 1979 studied sociology at the University of Amsterdam. During his military service, he was active in the national servicemen’s union, the VVDM, serving for a year as a member of the national executive. From 1984 to 1992, Van Heijningen lived in Nicaragua, where his then girlfriend—she is now his wife—worked as a general practitioner in the mountain village of Comalapa in the Department of Chontales. Initially he was employed as a journalist and consultant, in addition to which he was a volunteer in education, took part in vaccination campaigns in settlements in the mountains, and organised support for farmers' cooperatives, which were being attacked by the Contras. As a result of these activities, he was asked by the Nicaraguan authorities to help in establishing contacts with Western development organisations. In 1988, on the basis of a contract with the Dutch Volunteers’ Foundation, he became a policy advisor to the Sandinista government. Following the Sandinistas’ defeat in the 1990 elections Van Heijningen led a research project into the peasantry’s involvement both in the Sandinista revolution and with the US-backed armed Contra rebels. This research project and the political education programme which grew out of it formed part of the successful efforts on the part of the Sandinista Party (FSLN) to put an end to war-related violence and move towards the normalisation of social and political relations.

Following his return to the Netherlands, Van Heijningen worked on a dissertation on peasant resistance to the Sandinista government in Nicaragua. On 5 December 1994, he was awarded his doctorate after a successful defence before Professor Gerrit Huizer at the Catholic University of Nijmegen.

From 1998 to October 2005, Van Heijningen was coordinator of the XminY Solidarity Fund. In this capacity he was involved in the action group Keer het Tij (Turn the Tide), in campaigns for peace in Afghanistan and Iraq with the action group Platform tegen de Nieuwe Oorlog (Platform against the New War), and with the foundation Stop de Uitverkoop van de Beschaving (Stop the Sell-off of Civilisation). He was joint initiator of ATTAC Nederland, which was for several years an active participant in the movement against neoliberal globalisation. It was during this period that he joined the SP, standing as the 13th-place candidate on the party’s list for the parliamentary elections of 2003. Following a disappointing result which saw him fail to be elected, Van Heijningen joined the SP’s parliamentary staff as an advisor on foreign policy. In his capacity as founder of the Comité Grondwet Nee (Committee for a No to the Constitution), in the referendum of 2005 he played a significant role in the successful campaign against the European Constitution. Later that month, on 20 June 2005, Van Heijningen, at the 13th Congress of the SP, was elected party secretary, with responsibility for everything which affects the party’s organisation.

== ‘Pies and firearms’ ==
On 23 August 2003, the journalists Peter Siebelt and Martijn Koolhoven suggested in the Dutch national newspaper De Telegraaf, under the headline "SP'er betaalde taartactie tegen Pim" ("SP member paid for pie demonstration against Pim") that Van Heijningen had financed the bombardment with pies of Pim Fortuyn on 14 March 2002, about a month and a half before the populist right-wing leader was murdered. As coordinator of XminY he would have been responsible for paying a subsidy of €450 to a Give-away shop in Hoenderloo. Later, two people who worked for the organisation which ran the shop were arrested in connection with the "pie-ing" of Fortuyn. In December 2003, following a complaint from Van Heijningen, the Raad voor de Journalistiek (Journalism Council), the body responsible for upholding journalistic standards in the Netherlands, issued the following ruling: 'This report represents such a stain on the (character of) the complainants (Van Heijningen and the SP - ed.) that it should not have been published without a proper factual basis. Since any such basis is lacking, the defendants have, with the publication of this headline, overstepped the bounds.’ De Telegraaf ignored requests for rectification.

From the pen of publicist Peter Siebelt and De Telegraaf journalists Martijn Koolhoven and Joost de Haas, numerous articles have appeared over the years in which Van Heijningen has been linked with the [extreme left] movement in the Netherlands and the armed struggle in Nicaragua. During his time in Nicaragua Van Heijningen would have borne arms, including a Kalashnikov, supplied to him by the Sandinistas. By his own account, however, he never took part in armed actions against the Contras. Boudewijn Geels of the national newspaper HP/De Tijd, who carried out intensive research among Dutch citizens who have spent time in Nicaragua, came in the weekly edition of 12 September 2008 to the conclusion that there was no ‘smoking gun’.

== Publications ==
Hans van Heijningen has published a large number of books (in Dutch and Spanish). Unfortunately, only one is available (including free of charge as a pdf) in English. Sniffing Glue; living in dead-end street, Tesis-Association, Managua-Nicaragua, 1999.
