= Labrousse (surname) =

Labrousse is a surname found in France. It was first found in the region of Burgundy, and about 4,318 people in total bear this name today. Notable people with this surname include:

- Alain Labrousse (1937 – 2016), a French sociologist and journalist
- Clotilde-Suzanne Courcelles de Labrousse (1747 – 1821), a French occultist
- Elisabeth Labrousse (1914 – 2000), a French philosopher and historian
- Ernest Labrousse (1895 – 1988), a French historian
- Fabrice Labrousse (1806 – 1876), a French playwright
- François Labrousse (1878 – 1951), a French politician
- Julien Labrousse (born 1977), a French entrepreneur and architect
- Léa Labrousse (born 1997), a French trampolinist
- Michel Labrousse (1912 – 1988), a French historian
- Sara Labrousse (born 1988), a French synchronized swimmer
- Thierry Labrousse (born 1970), a French former rugby player
- Yvette Labrousse, better known as Begum Om Habibeh Aga Khan (1906 – 2000), a French-Egyptian beauty queen
