= Labrousse =

Labrousse could refer to:

- Labrousse, Cantal, a commune in Cantal département, France
- Saint-Julien-Labrousse, a former commune in Ardèche département, France
- Labrousse (surname), a French surname
