= Siervos de Dios y amos de indios? =

1968 book by Victor Daniel Bonilla

- Author: Victor Daniel Bonilla
- Publisher: Universidad del Cauca
- Publication date: 1968

Siervos de Dios y amos de indios (Servants of God and Masters of Indians) is a book first published in 1968, in which Víctor Daniel Bonilla denounces the oppression and cultural genocide of indigenous peoples in Colombia.

The book contains the events and testimonies of facts that occurred in the Sibundoy Valley, in the Putumayo Department in the southwest of Colombia. It relates how the lands that the Inga and Kamentsás Indians had inherited from the cacique Carlos Tamoabioy were invaded by settlers and missionaries of the Catholic Church. The book served as a basis for the revision of the Concordat between the Vatican and the Republic of Colombia.

Siervos de Dios y amos de indios has been translated into French with adaptation for a European audience. The French translation has itself been translated into English, as Servants of God or Masters of Men?
