= For the Liberation of Brazil =

1971 book by Carlos Marighella

- Author: Carlos Marighella
- Publication date: 1971

For the Liberation of Brazil is a Marxist tract on guerrilla warfare written by Carlos Marighella. First published in France as Carlos Marighela: Pour la Libération du Brésil presented by Conrad Detrez, Editions du Seuil, 1970. In March 1970 the Journal Official announced that the sale and distribution of the book throughout French territory would be forbidden.

It was then published in English by Penguin Books in 1971 as part of their "Pelican Latin American Library" series and with more material than the French version. This edition was translated by John Butt and Rosemary Sheed with an introduction by Richard Gott (pp. 7–15).

The first part of the book provides a timeline of events that includes actions taken by the Revolutionary Movement 8th October:

1. "Marighela Calls on the People to Join the Struggle" (Sept 1969)
2. "Declaration by the ALN October Revolutionary Group" (Sept 1969)
3. "Greetings to the Fifteen Patriots"
4. "On the Organizational Function of Revolutionary Violence" (May 1969)
5. "Problems and Principles of Strategy" (Jan 1969)
6. "Questions of Organization" (Dec 1968)
7. "Handbook of Urban Guerrilla Warfare" (June 1969)
8. "On Rural Guerrilla Warfare"
9. "Guerrilla Tactics and Operations"
10. "Call to the Brazilian People "
11. "Letter to Fidel Castro" (Aug 1967)
12. "Declaration by the Communist Group of São Paulo"

The second part consists of articles written in 1966 before he left the Brazilian Communist Party including his resignation letter penned on December 10, 1966.
