= International School Groningen =

Dutch school

Coordinates: 53.1845°N 6.5903°E

International School Groningen (ISG) is an International School situated in Haren, Groningen, in the north of the Netherlands. The school consists of approximately 200 students from various countries. During their first five years, the students follow the IB Middle Years Programme or IBMYP and during their last two years they follow the IB Diploma Programme or IBDP.

== History ==
The ISG is a part of a Dutch secondary school called the "Maartens College". The main building of the ISG is called the Esserberg. Two other buildings are part of the school; the 'D building', and a newly constructed building called the 'new building', nicknamed by the students 'the F building'. It was the logical thing after the 'D building'. Many students, especially the older students, also have classes in the building of the Maartens College. The Maartens College follows the basic Dutch programs (VMBO, HAVO, VWO) and also has a programme called TTO (Twee Talig Onderwijs), translated as bilingual education, which is taught in Dutch and English. TTO is conducted in a similar way to the MYP system that the ISG uses. The Maartens College has around 1440 students, while the International School Groningen has around 200 students, both totalling 1570.

The school management consists of Mr. M. Weston (Head of School), Ms. S. Hartholt (Deputy Head - MYP) and Ms. J. Jansma (Deputy Head - DP). The school is an international school, however, many native Dutch students, often ones who have previously lived abroad, also attend this school. Many different nationalities are represented in this school; England, America, Denmark, South Africa, Germany, Poland, France, Canada, Czech Republic, Malaysia, India, Philippines, etc.
