= Le Trianon (theatre) =

Theatre in Paris, France

- Trianon-Concert (1894); Trianon-Théâtre (1902); Théâtre Victor-Hugo (1903); Trianon-Lyrique
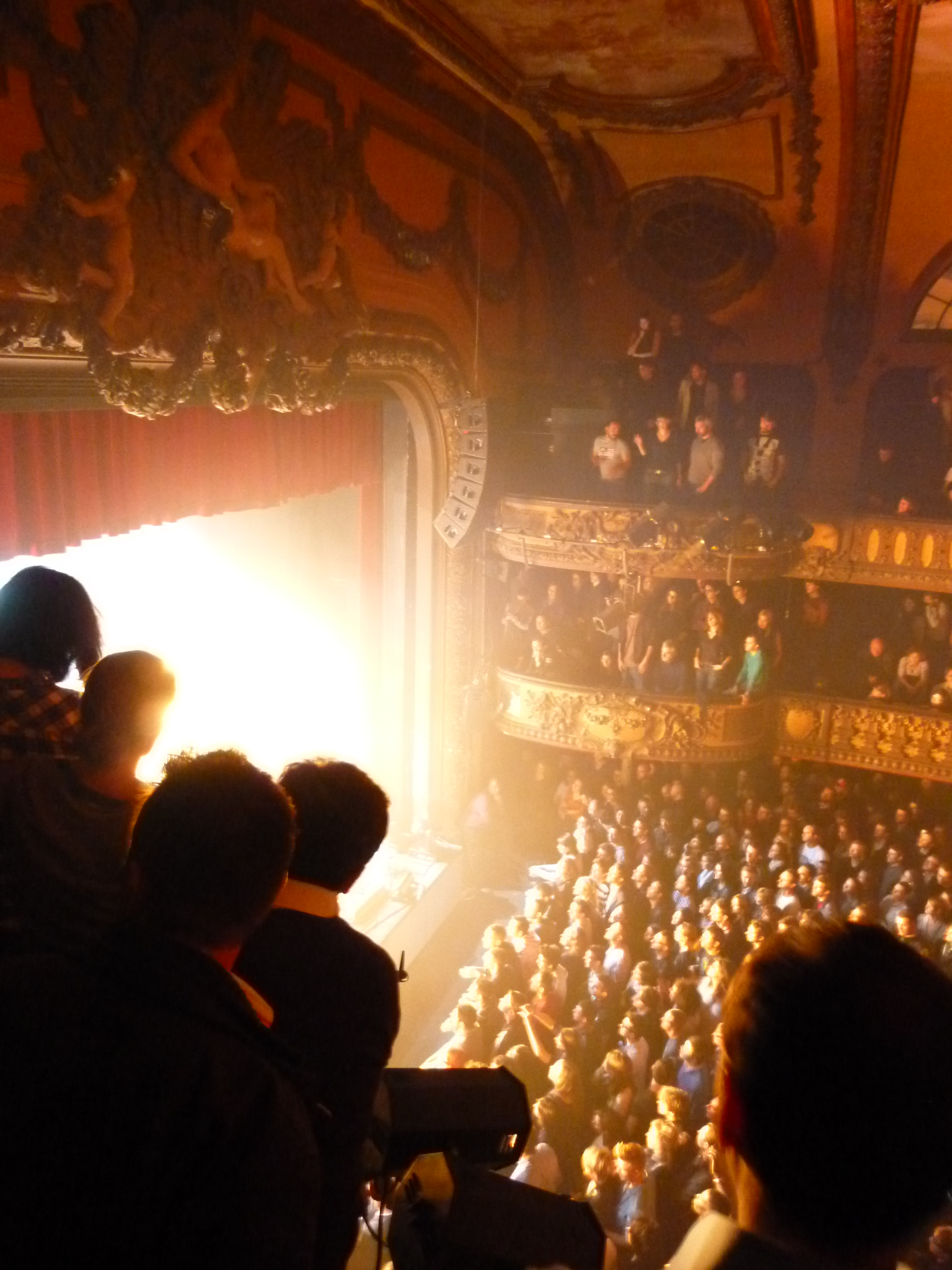
- View from the second balcony during a performance

- Location within Paris
- Coordinates: 48.882839°N 2.343059°E
- Capacity: 1,091
- Type: Private theater

Construction
- Opened: 1894
- Architect: Joseph Cassien-Bernard

Website
- www.letrianon.fr

Le Trianon (French pronunciation: [lə tʁijanɔ̃]) is a theatre and concert hall in Paris. It is located at 80, boulevard de Rochechouart, in the 18th arrondissement of Paris, at the foot of the hill of Montmartre.

== Café concert (1894–1900) ==
The Trianon-Concert was built as a café concert in 1894 in the garden of the Élysée Montmartre, which was requisitioned for the purpose. Édouard Jean Niermans (1859–1928), a young architect who designed or rebuilt several theaters around that time, designed and decorated the Trianon-Concert. Opening in 1895, the Trianon-Concert was one of Paris's first music halls. Mistinguett, (Jeanne-Marie Bourgeois) made her debut at the Petit-Casino and the Trianon-Concert in its first year. Although her voice was thin, she was an accomplished mimic and comedian who became known for her shapely legs and risqué routines, and later became a star at the Moulin Rouge.

In 1897 a new owner of the Élysée Montmartre refurbished the property, making two rooms: one for concerts, reviews and recitals, and the other for dancing and skating. The architect, again Édouard Niermans, used steelwork salvaged from Gustave Eiffel's Pavillon de France, built for the Exposition universelle (1889). Artists such as La Goulue, Grille d’Egoût and Valentin le désossé performed on the stage, and Henri de Toulouse-Lautrec was a regular visitor. The quick-change artist Leopoldo Fregoli performed there.

However, on the night of February 17–18, 1900 the hall and some of the other buildings of the Élysée were destroyed by a fire. Only the facade remained. Fregoli, who had been playing there for the past five days, lost all his decorations and costumes.

== Theater and music hall (1902–1939) ==
After the fire, the architect Joseph Cassian Bernard, a student of Charles Garnier and the designer of the Pont Alexandre III, undertook construction of a new 1000-seat theater in the Italian style, with two levels of balconies. It was inaugurated on December 18, 1902 as the Trianon-Théâtre. The theater was renamed the Théâtre Victor-Hugo in 1903, a subsidized theater that gave performances of classical works. In 1906 the theater became the Trianon-Comique. It was home to a branch of the Opéra-Comique that specialized in operetta. Picasso visited the theater and drew portraits of many of the habitués. In 1917 the theater was renamed the Trianon-Lyrique. It became simply Le Trianon in 1920. In 1936 Le Trianon became a music hall, putting on performances by artists such as Yvette Guilbert, Marie Dubas, Fréhel and Pierre Dac.

== Cinema (1939–1992) ==
In 1939 the hall was converted into the Cinéphone Rochechouart, a cinema, using projectors that had been installed in 1936. Jacques Brel frequented the cinema in the early 1950s, where he wrote some of his texts. In the post-war years the cinema was a popular venue, putting on family shows that might include a documentary and newsreel, live performances, and then a movie in color and cinemascope. Costume dramas were followed by swashbuckling adventure films, spaghetti westerns and then karate and kung fu films. However, by the mid-1980s audiences were slumping as TV and VCR provided convenient alternatives to the cinema. In 1992 the cinema was forced to close.

== Recent years ==
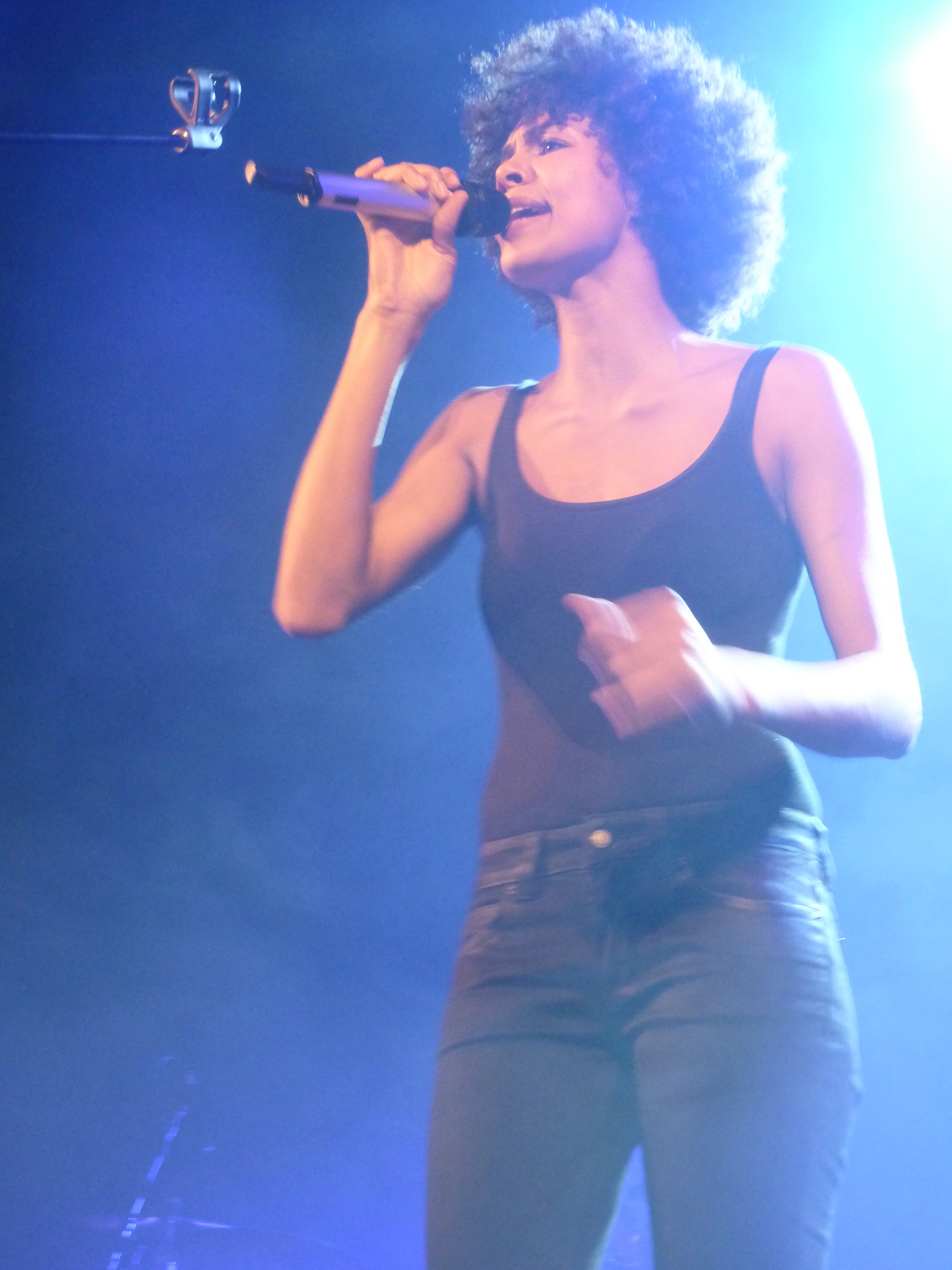
Ayọ at the Trianon on 21 March 2011

After returning to live performance, the theater presented plays and classical music concerts but was best known for performances of singers such as Carla Bruni, Jacqueline Danno, Bénabar and Higelin, and for musical comedies. The theater also staged operas, operettas, musicals, show cases, fashion shows, movie previews, variety shows and festivals. It hosted the final phase of auditions of the Nouvelle Star TV show from 2003. Les Wriggles recorded a show on September 23, 2005.

Included in the inventory of historical monuments in 1988, "Le Trianon" was closed for a complete restoration in 2009 did by Julien Labrousse architect and new owner of the place. It reopened to the public on November 20, 2010 with a series of concerts by artists that included M.I.A., Goldfrapp, Deftones, Tricky, Ayọ, Chic, Herman Dune, Julien Doré, Gonzales, Rodrigo y Gabriela, Raphael Saadiq and Macy Gray. Le Trianon hosted the French-naturalized Indonesian singer Anggun for her concert in June 2012. The singer Rihanna appeared at Le Trianon on November 17, 2012 during her "777 tour" to promote her new album Unapologetic. And in July 2013, Singer-songwriter and Rapper Ke$ha performed during her European Leg of her 2nd solo headlining tour the Warrior Tour. On December 11, 2013, English superstar Fryars played a show to a captivated and aroused audience. On October 17, 2015, for the first time, the venue held a Death metal concert starring the band Opeth, celebrating their 25th anniversary for a sold out crowd.

American pop girl group Fifth Harmony performed their concert at the venue on November 9, 2015 as the last and final stop on the European leg of their extended Reflection Tour.

The facade at different times

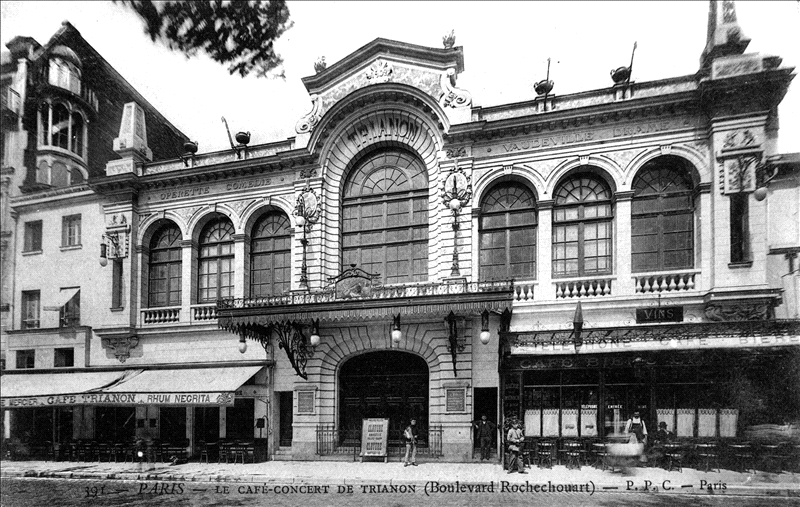
Early photo of the café concert. The facade survived the fire of 1900.

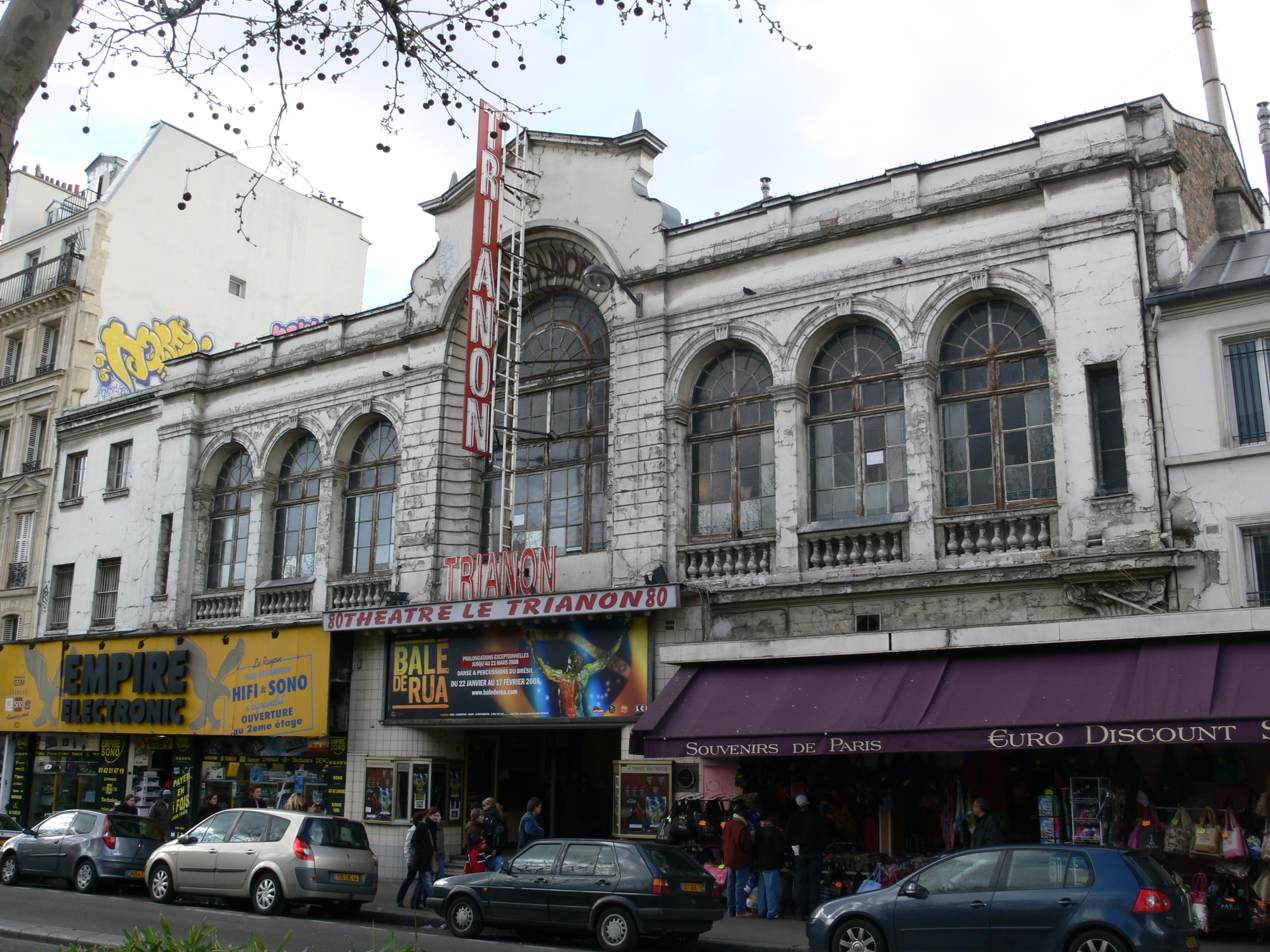
Exterior in 2008 before restoration

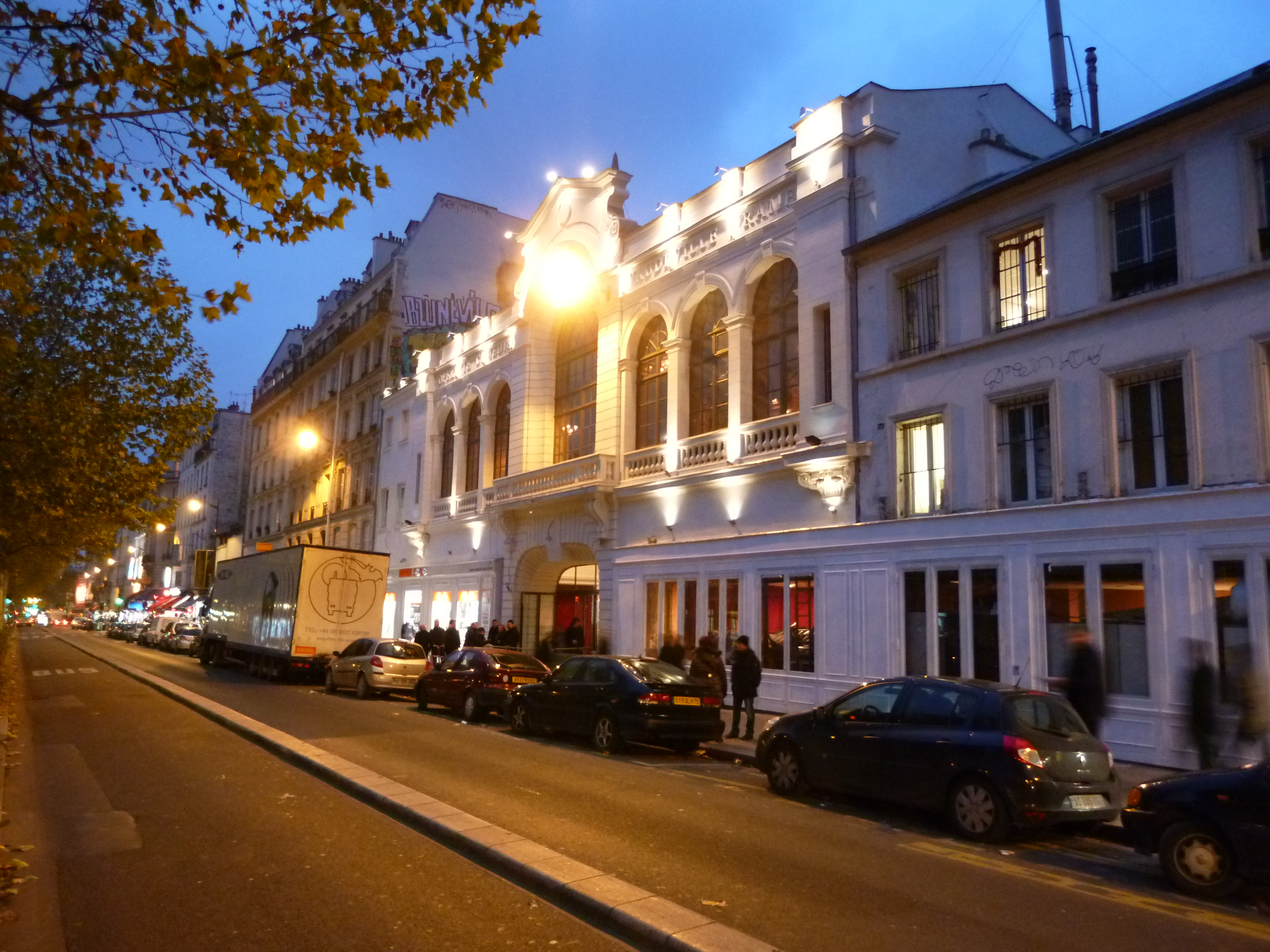
Restored facade at night in 2010

Click on images to enlarge

== Facilities ==
The Trianon has a grand entrance on the ground floor and contains the ballroom, winter garden, theater and a restaurant on the street, as well as dressing rooms, catering and offices. The theater can hold 647 people seated in the orchestra and 440 people in the two balconies. Each of the balconies has a hall and wide stairs leading down to the vestibule and ballroom. On the ground floor "Le Petit Trianon" is a coffee shop designed from the origins of the establishment and again in operation since May 2011 after 20 years of closure. The theater is served by the Anvers metro station.

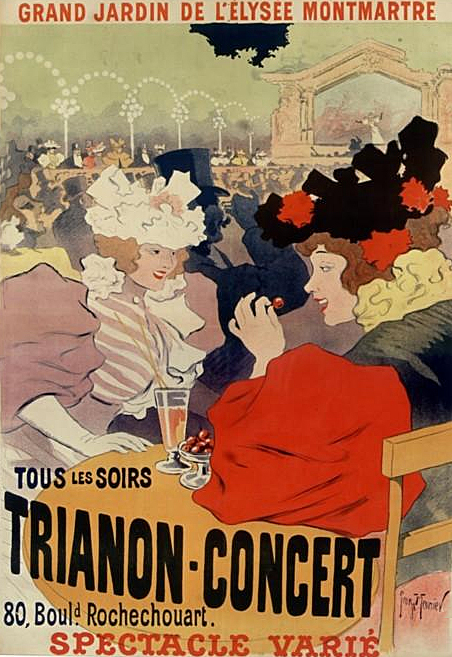
1895 poster for the café concert

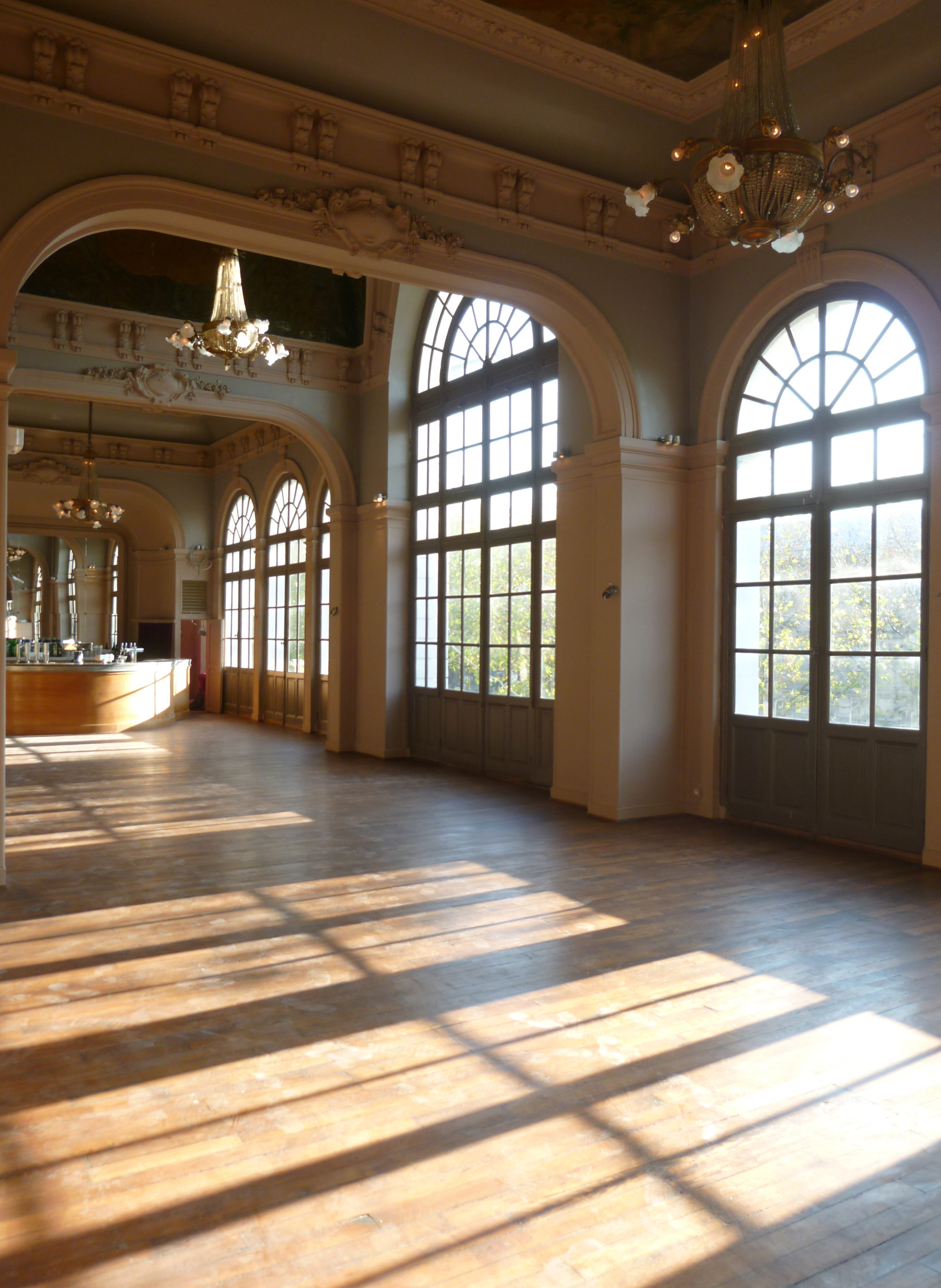
The ballroom

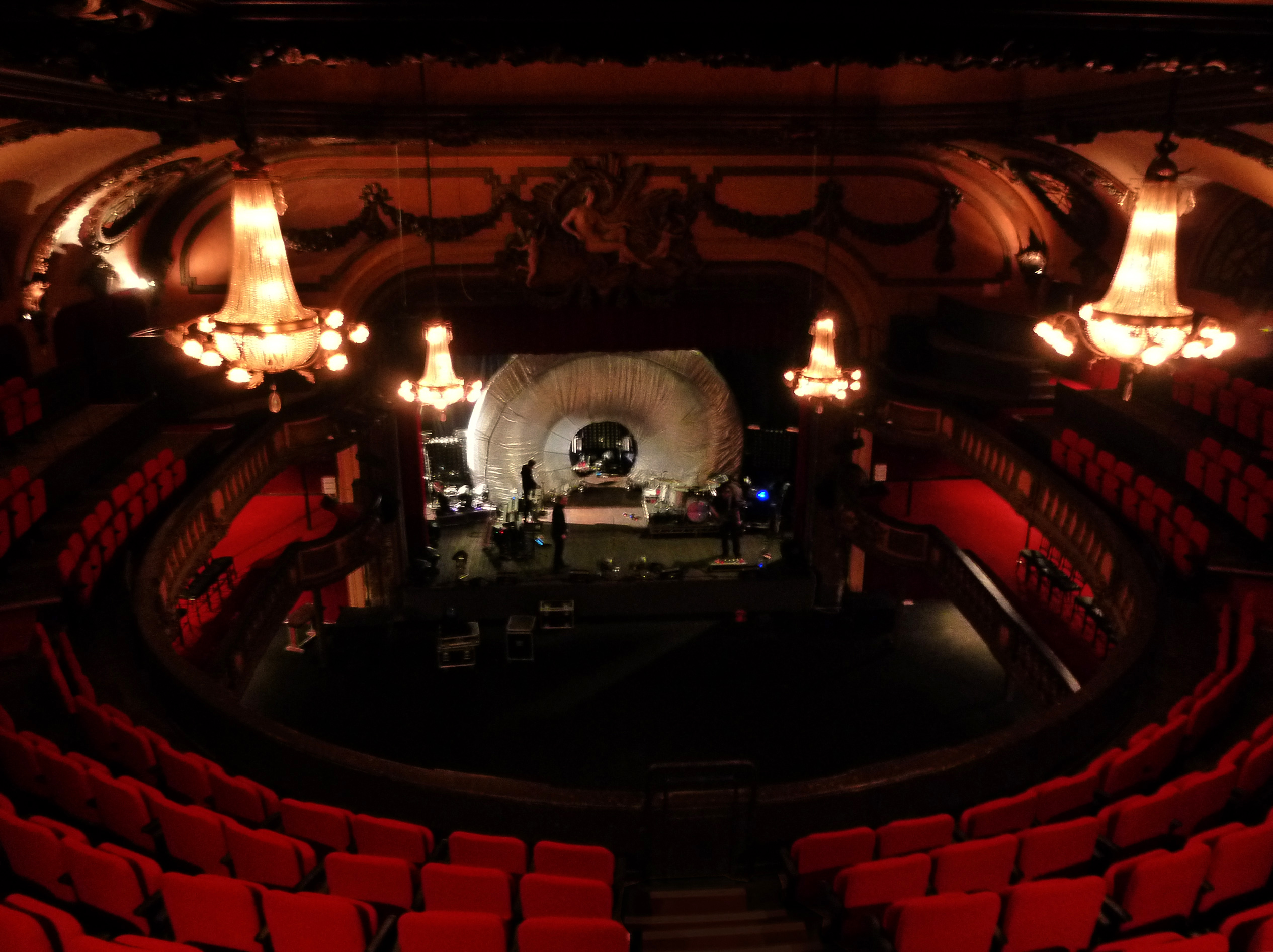
View from the upper balcony

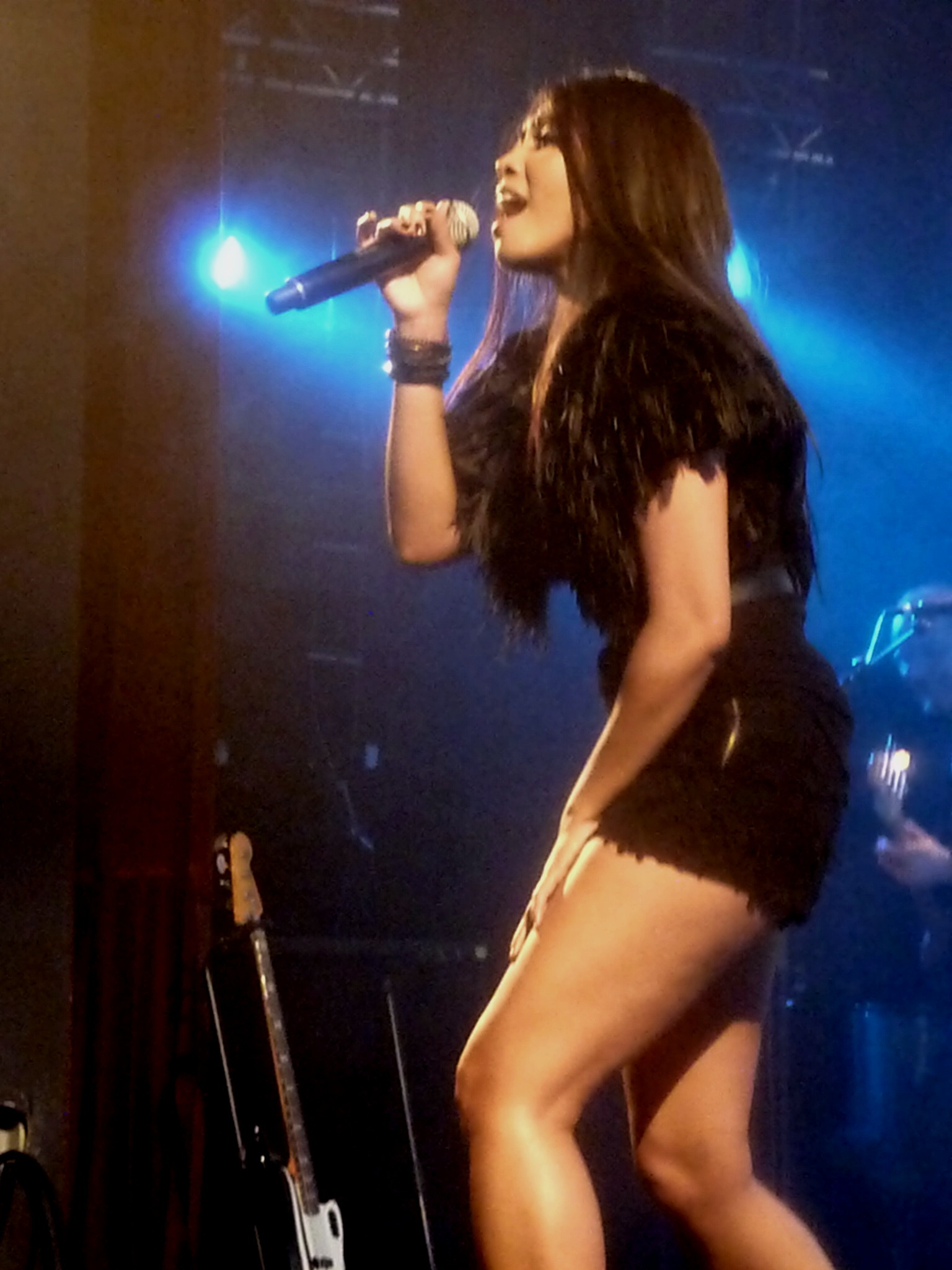
The singer Anggun in concert at the Trianon in June 2012

Click on images to enlarge
