= Palácio do Grilo =

Monument in Lisbon

- Palácio do Grilo
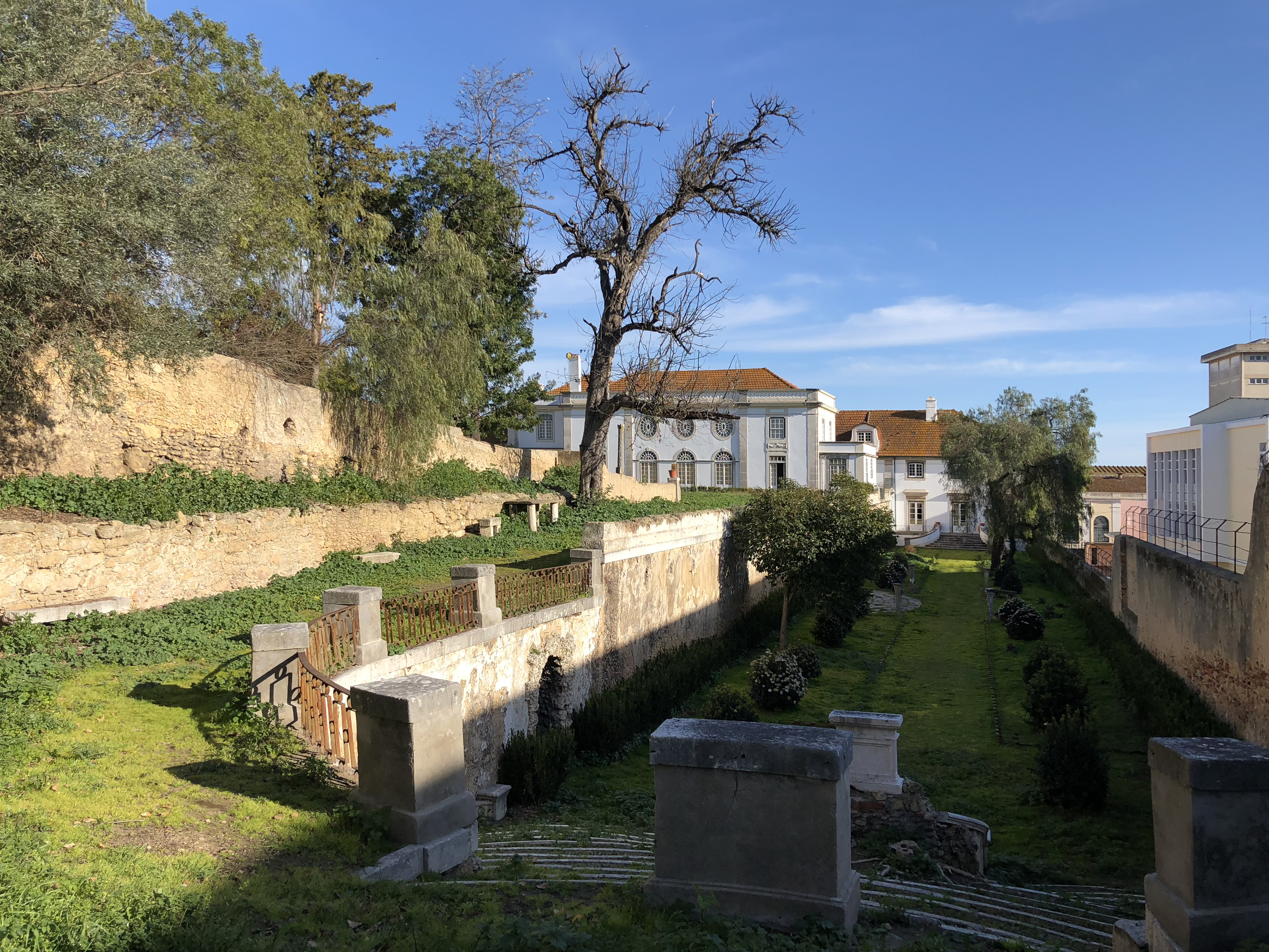
- Palacio do Grilo - Side facades of the garden
- Alternative names: Palácio dos Duques de Lafões

General information
- Architectural style: Neoclassical architecture
- Location: Beato, Lisbon, Portugal
- Coordinates: 38°43′57.4″N 9°06′23.7″W
- Construction started: 1756
- Completed: 1760

Design and construction
- Architect: Eugénio dos Santos

Website
- http://www.palaciogrilo.com

Palácio do Grilo (English: Grilo Palace), also known as the Palace of the Dukes of Lafões (Portuguese: Palácio dos Duques de Lafões), is located at the corner of Grilo Street with the Dukes of Lafões Sidewalk, standing in the Beato parish in the heart of the city of Lisbon.

The structure constitutes an architectural complex of the 18th century and predominantly Neoclassic style punctuated by baroque expressions and motifs. The construction of the building is intimately related to a few historical contingencies that have witnessed the Palace's extensive construction process. It has been classified as a monument of public interest since 2011.

== History ==
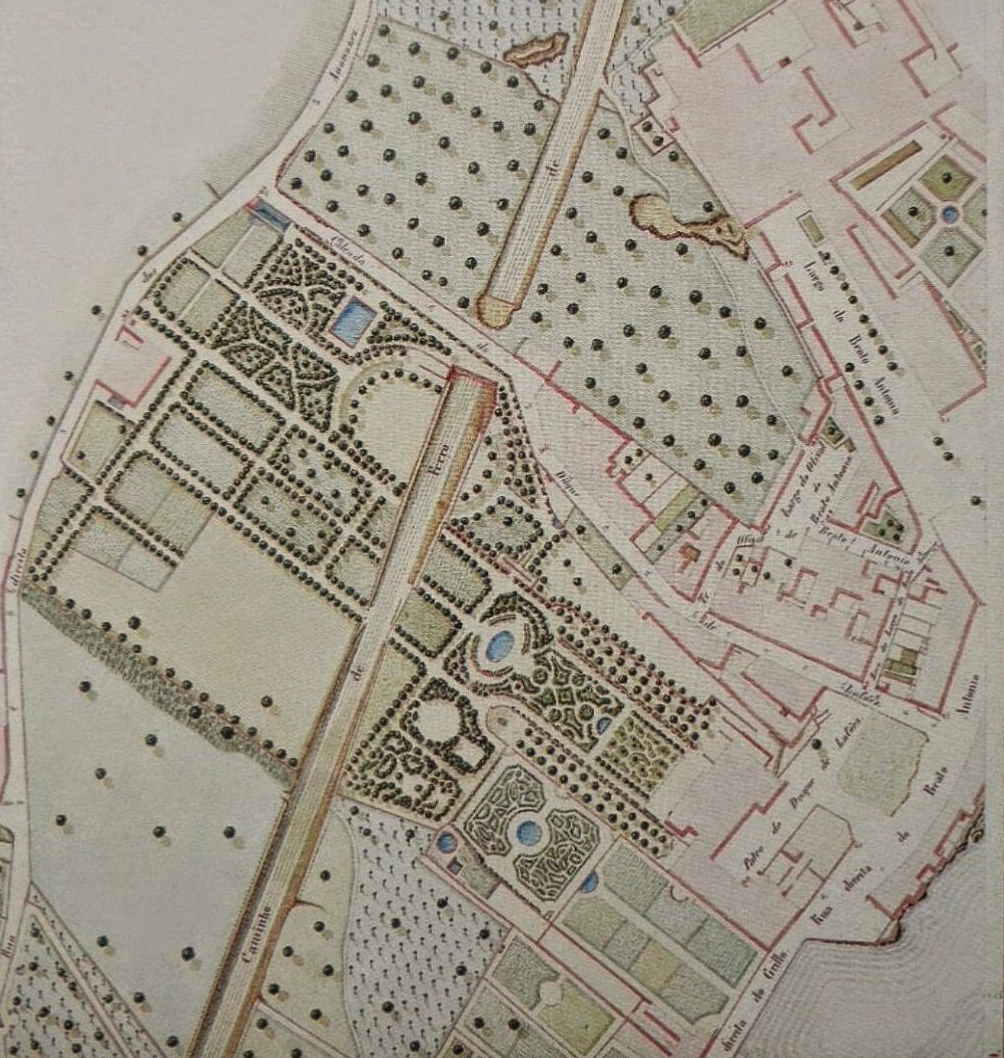
Atlas of the topographic map of Lisbon, Filipe Folque 1856-1858

The Grilo Palace is set upon a pre-existing palatial structure located at the Grilo Farm that previously belonged to D. António de Mascarenhas. The exact date of construction concerning the pre-existing palatial structure is unknown. This farm was constituted by a very large land property that ascended the uphill pronounced slope, known today as Dukes of Lafões Sidewalk.

Following Lisbon's massive earthquake on 1 November 1755, it is attributed to D. Pedro Henrique de Bragança having refused to light up his residence on the occasion of the marriage between the Infant D. Pedro III and the king's eldest daughter and future queen, D. Maria I, princess of Brazil. This episode has made the Palace famous. The Duke D. Pedro Henrique de Bragança was one of the only two pretenders to the princess's hand, and consequently also to the Portuguese throne as consort king. It is important to understand that this particular occurrence happened a few years after he found himself in a dispute with his uncle, king D. John V of Portugal, that originated due to D. Pedro Henrique de Bragança's romantic relationship with Luísa Clara de Portugal.

The 1st Duke of Lafões directed the construction of Grilo Palace after Lisbon's massive earthquake on 1 November 1755. D. Pedro Henrique was first given the opportunity however due to his premature death in 1761, it was delegated to the Duke's younger brother: D. João Carlos de Bragança, Duke de Lafões.

== Architecture ==
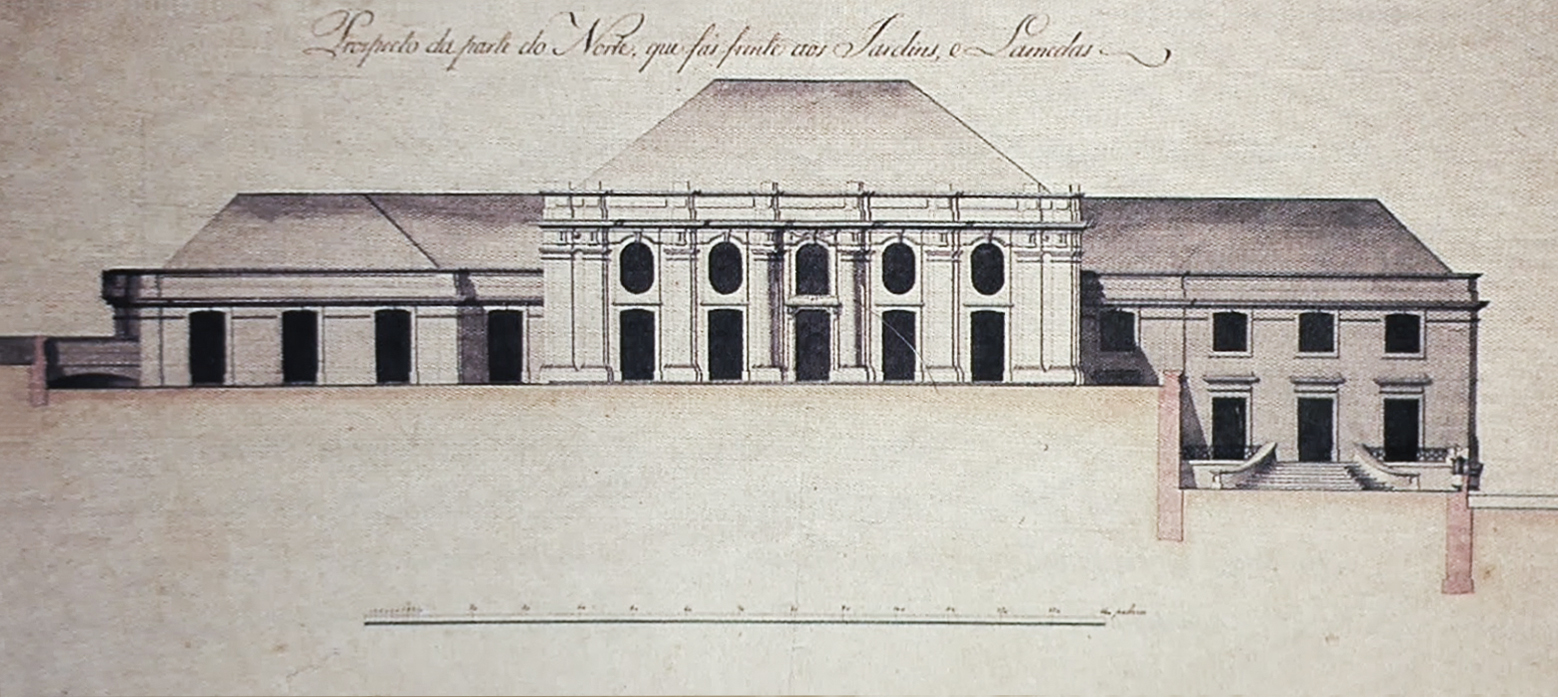
Plan of the project of Eugénio dos Santos - Palacio do Grilo

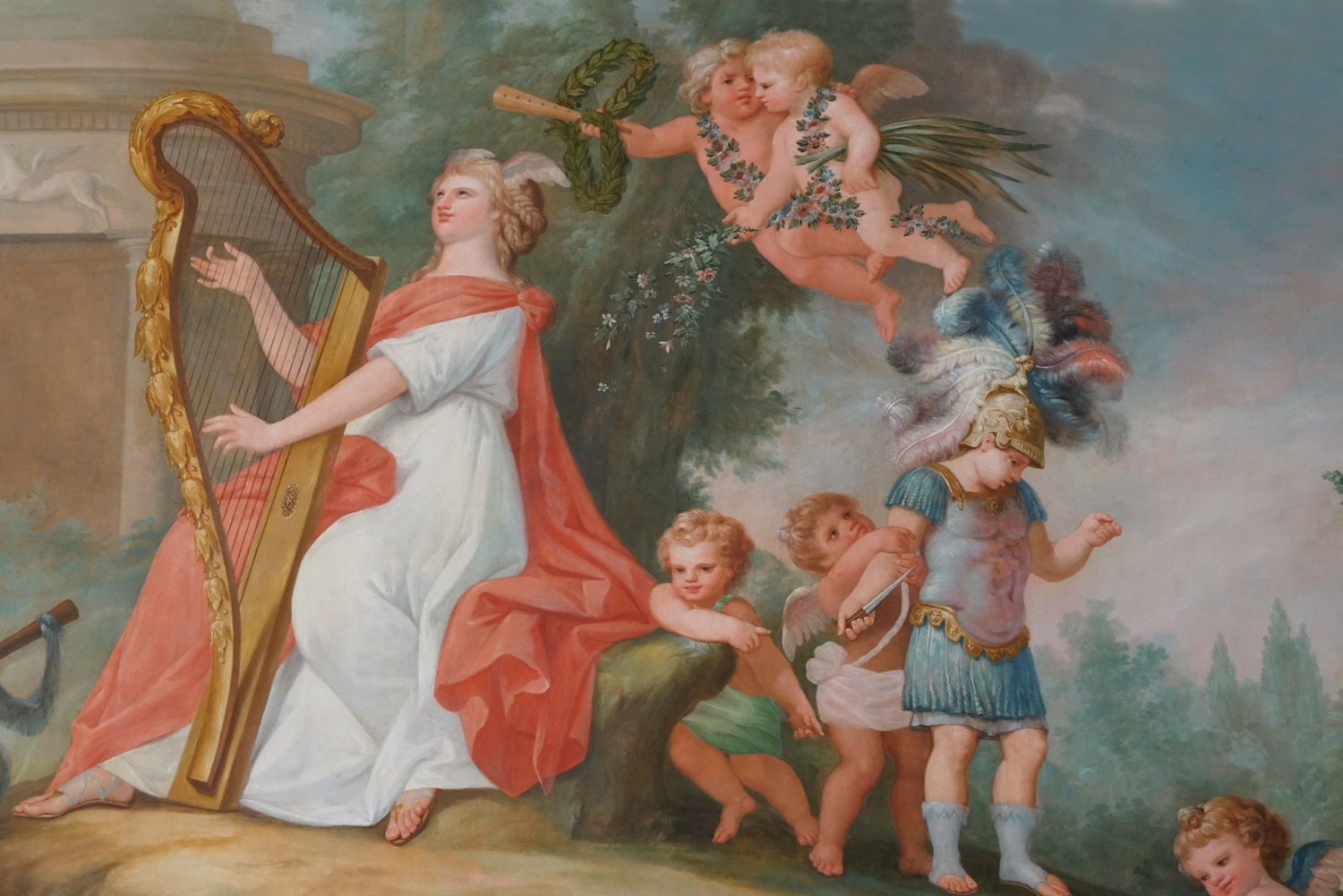
Murals painting of Academia room by Cyrillo Volkmar Machado

The construction structures that integrate the current architectonic complex of Grilo Palace are constituted by the sum of the interventions made throughout the years. The architecture is attributed to Eugénio dos Santos.

The interior is synonymous of decorative programs around cultural diversity and erudition, there are sets of murals painting by Cyrillo Volkmar Machado and canvases from the eighteenth and nineteenth centuries, they integrate theme lounges in the palace, such as the hall of the academy, the hall of Venus or the Chinese room.

The structure was arranged in L shape, having its major compound oriented in the north–south direction, being thus vertical to Tejo River whilst the structure's minor compound was in turn facing towards the river, as well as the public avenue. In the interior part of the L structure, a patio used to exist, contained by other more modest constructions. The patio was located at the upper level of the street and could be accessed through a ramp that went under the shorter compound of the L-shaped structure.

The main part of the palace, the larger body of the L-shaped compound is, to this day, sensible to the already existing complex formed by the western wing. The main section standing on the avenue was doubled forming a facade of 11 apertures divided in 2 levels: ground level and noble floor. Similarly, the patio at the superior level with fairly approximate dimensions was also kept in the reconstruction project, with only minor corrections being necessary in order to maintain symmetry.

At the ground level, springing from the facade a great lounge was suggested, from which a simplified staircase would come to lead the way to a grand open ballroom, towering that same patio. On the east side another main section symmetrically disposed to the already existent one was proposed. Taking advantage of the slope in a masterly way, this new building provided access directly into the patio through a ramp today known as Duke of Lafões Sidewalk.

To the north of the central patio, stood another new main section. In the back, the gardens displayed in cascate through the hill. At the same level and connected to this lounge, was displayed another partition of extensive spaciousness, presumably destined to become a library considering the delimited markings on the plant.

In opposition to the tradition of other Lisbon palaces, the Palacio do Grilo project is composed of a scholarly complexity, characteristic of whom was used to maneuver architecture as a theoretical exercise of styling and to whom great palatian constructions would extend throughout Europe.

== Current status ==
In 2011, it attained the status of Public Interest Monument (PIM). In 2022, the Palais was restructured by architect Julien Labrousse, and in 2023 the project was laureate of the Versailles Prize - the UNESCO World Prize for Architecture and Design.

== Buildings ==
The access to the interior is done by the staircase of 18 stone stretches coated in glazed tiles of the late 18th century in blue and white representing mythological and gallant style (Diana and Actaeon); in the upper level section, 3 doors, with cocking-cloths in carmine velvet with coat of arms, topped with 19th century tiled panels in blue and white, trimmed with heraldic coats of arms of the Lafões, Cadaval, and Marialva Houses;

- Dining Hall: primitive terracotta tiled floor; 17th century tiled skirting board; smooth walls and ceiling (after restoration); portraits of family personalities and 1 depicting Isabel de Farnese;
- Lounge: restored in the mid-20th century, with fluted pilasters belonging to the Doric order embedded in the walls; the wall openings (vãos) lined in silk; a great vessel of Italian marble, on a niche at the top; D. Pedro II and D. João V portraits.
- Atrium: opening from the end of the patio, with the (restored) smooth plaster ceiling in smooth ovals; the upper garnish of the walls, with suspended garlands, ashlars of polychromed tiles, and also D. Maria I, in Estrela Basilica type; terracotta tiled floor;
- Oculus Room: accessible through the central gate, squared floor plan (originally rectangular) with 10 doors.
- Chapel: rectangular floor plan with stonework triumph arch, dividing the space in half; 4 doors in gilded wood at the ground level (2 in the main-chapel, 2 at the nave).
- Duke's Room: of rectangular plant with wooden pavement and door decorated with perpectivated painting; the ceiling presents ornamental paintings of large feasts, flower garlands and, over the communicating doors, putti pediments.
- Academia Room: of rectangular floor plan with 8 shafts and wooden pavement presenting stucco ceiling and walls painted with late 18th century polychromatic decoration.
- Chinese Room: squared floor plan with wooden pavement, presenting 5 shafts and walls in plaster with neoclassical style paintings depicting camafeus, feminine figures in fencings, flower garlands and large feasts with birds and diverse objects.
- Venus Room: squared floor plan with wooden pavement, 6 shafts with flowery painted motifs, plaster walls painted with delicate ornamental, ceiling with great central oval and painting framed by fencing depicting Vénus emerging from the waters supported by 2 newts.
- Arena: squared floor plan, located on the eastern side of the Oculus Room, presenting in the North facing facade a door with curbed stonework linte.
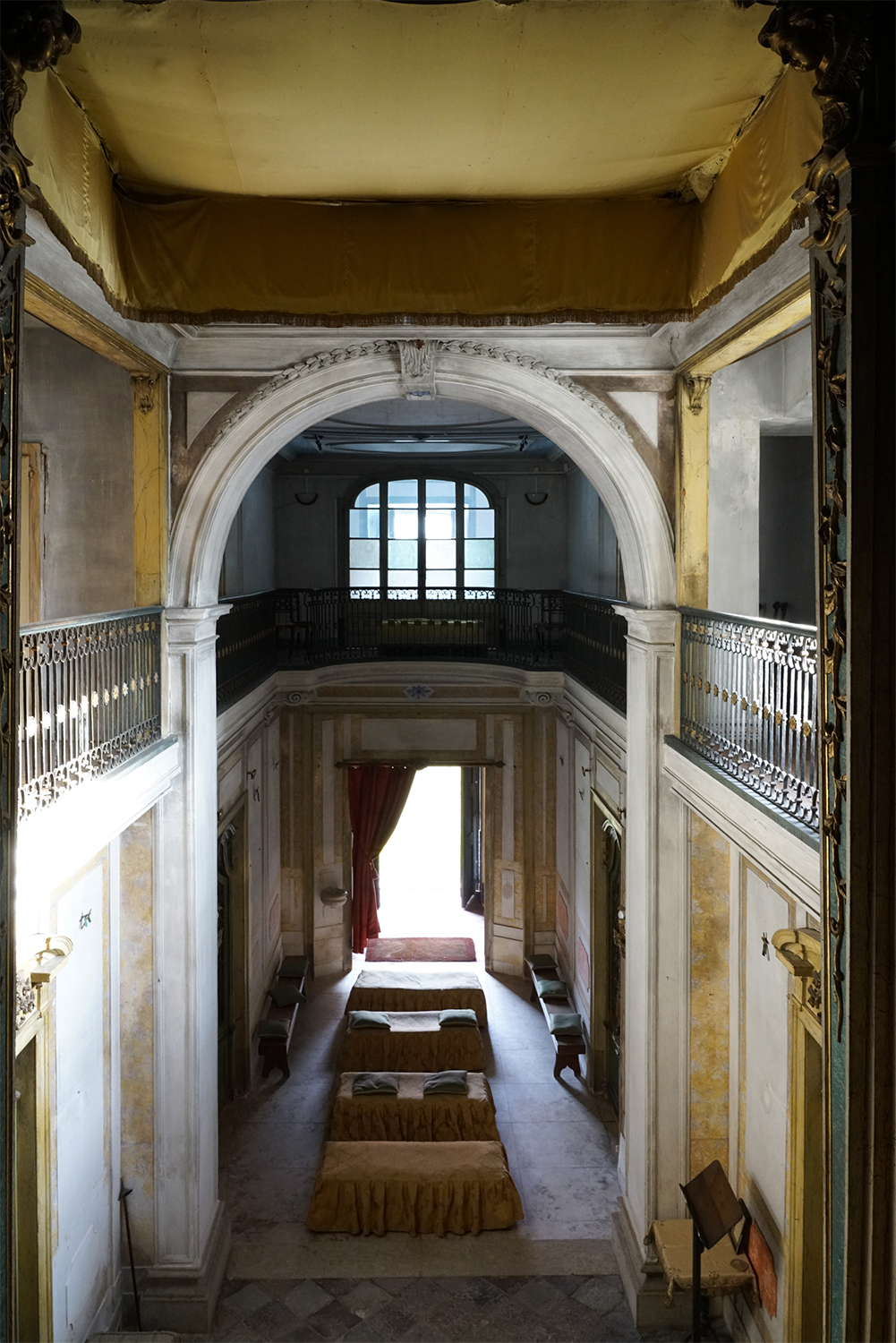
Chapel

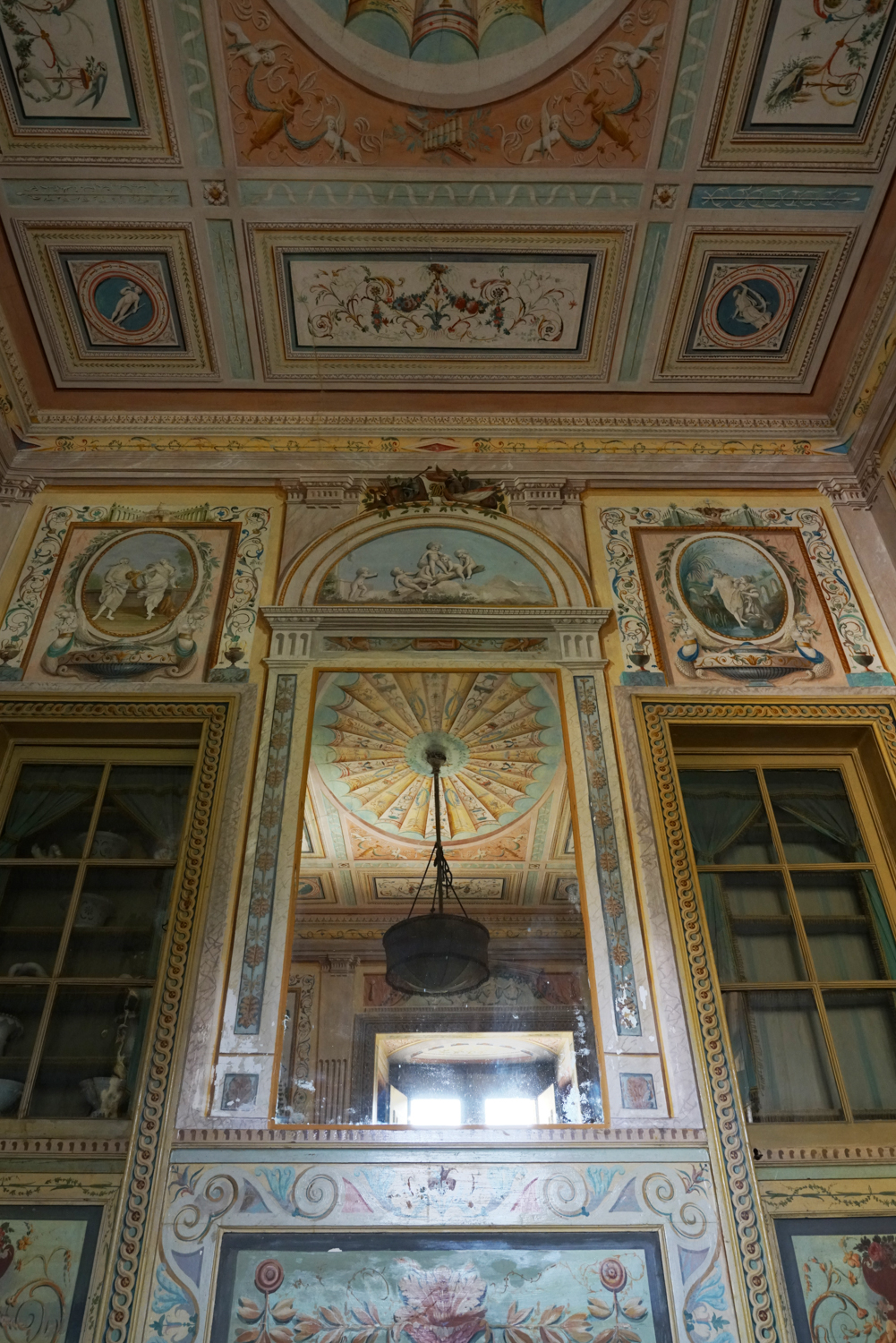
Chinese Room

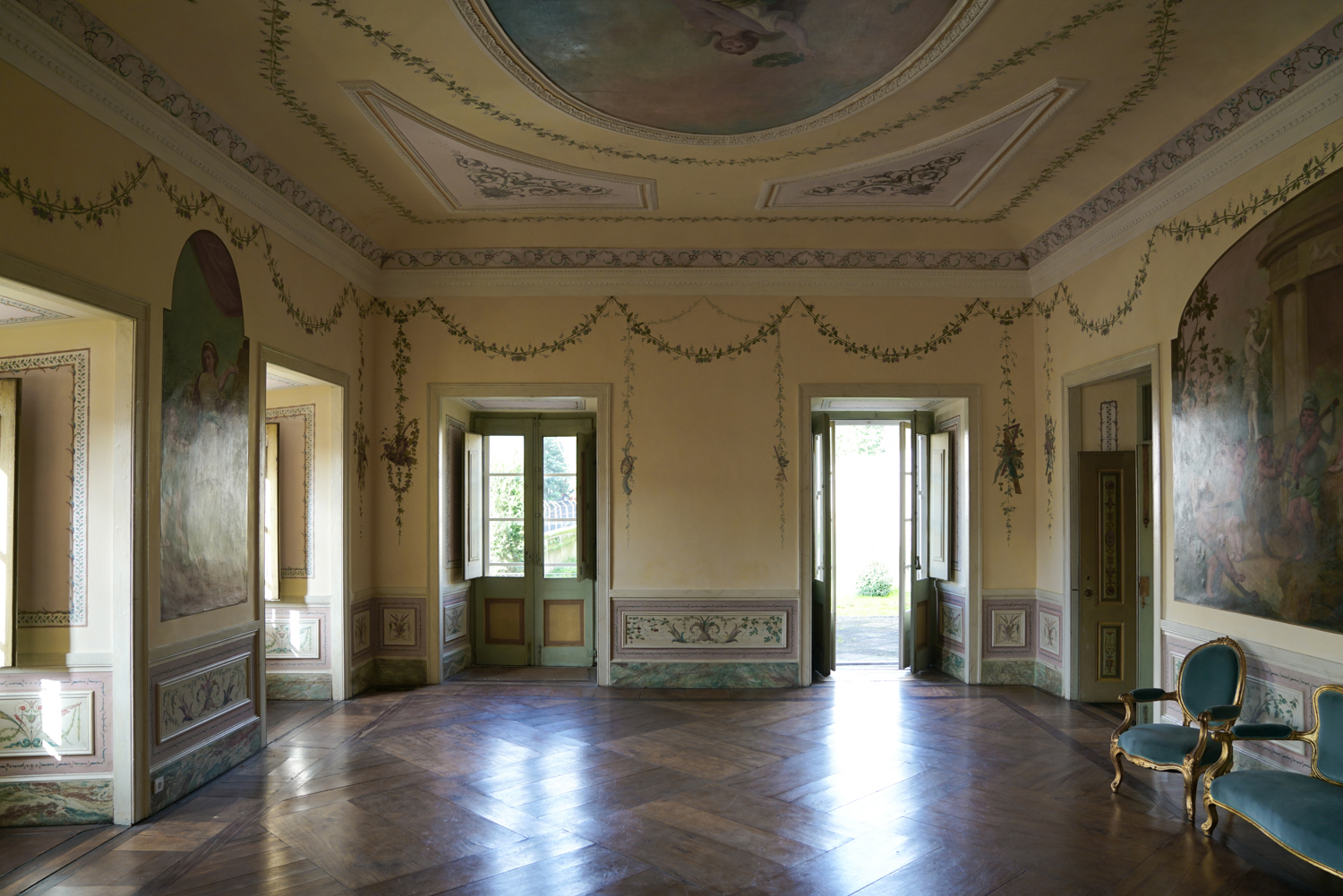
Academia room

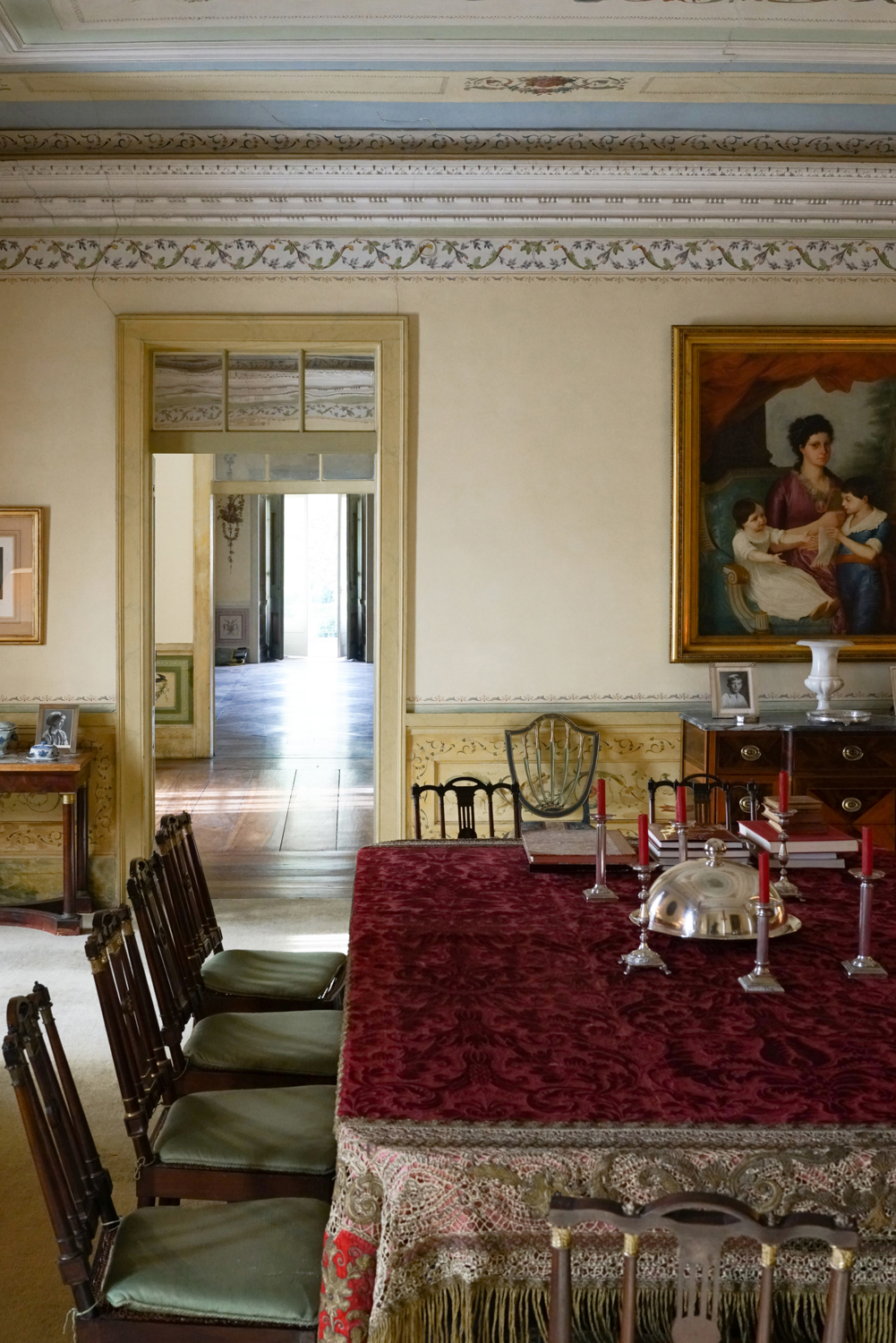
Venus room

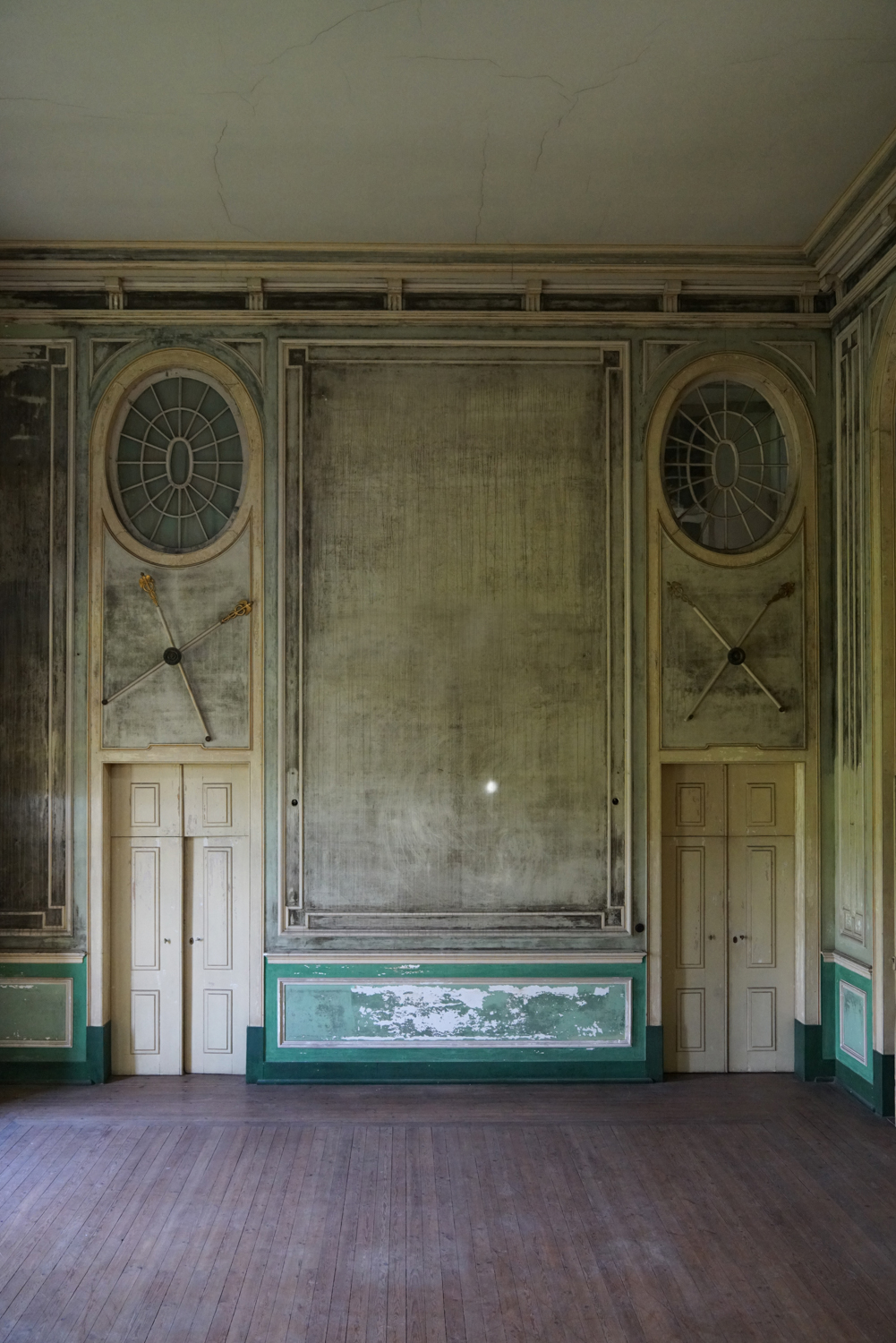
Oculus room

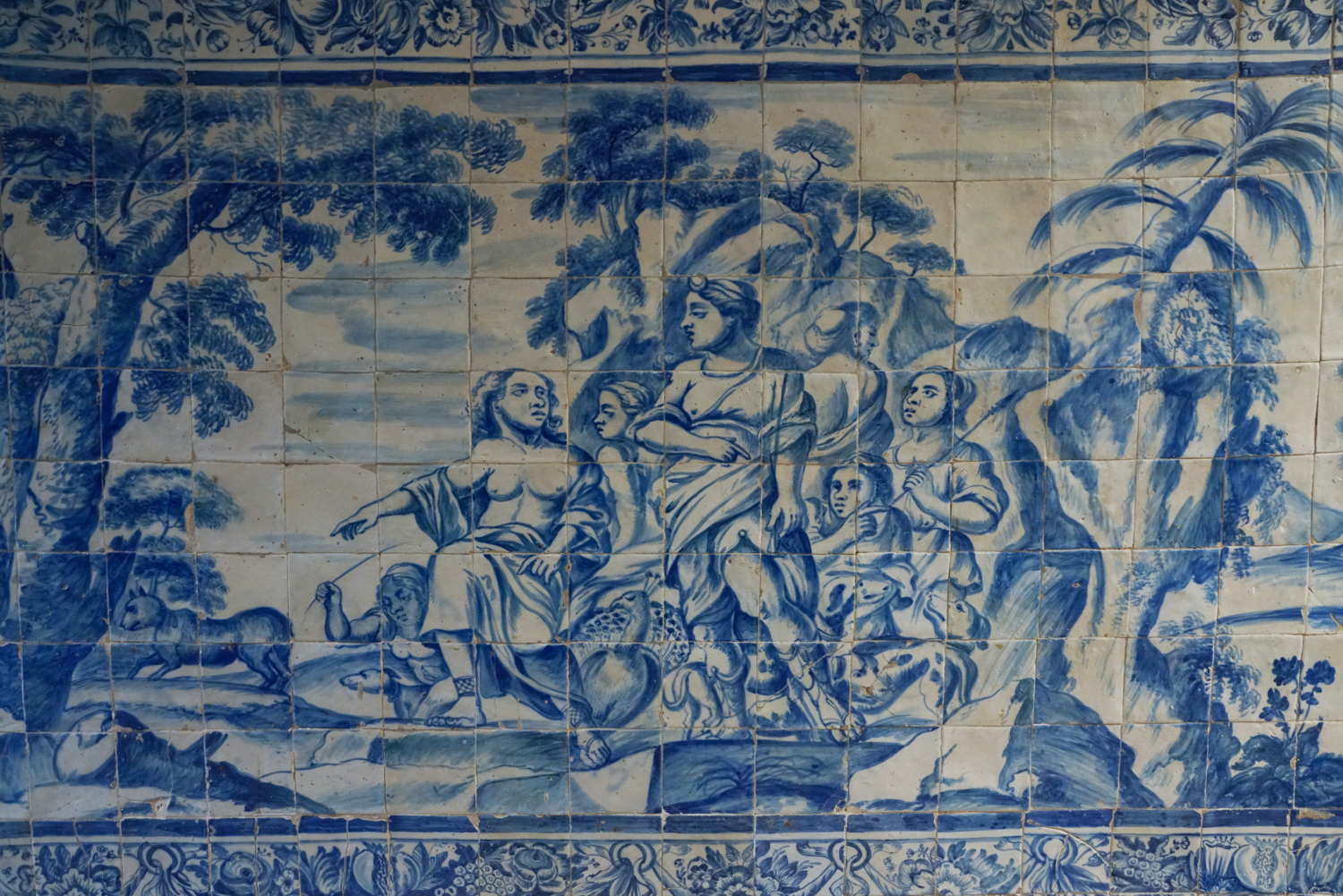
Tiles of Arena
