= Eugénio dos Santos =

Portuguese architect and military engineer

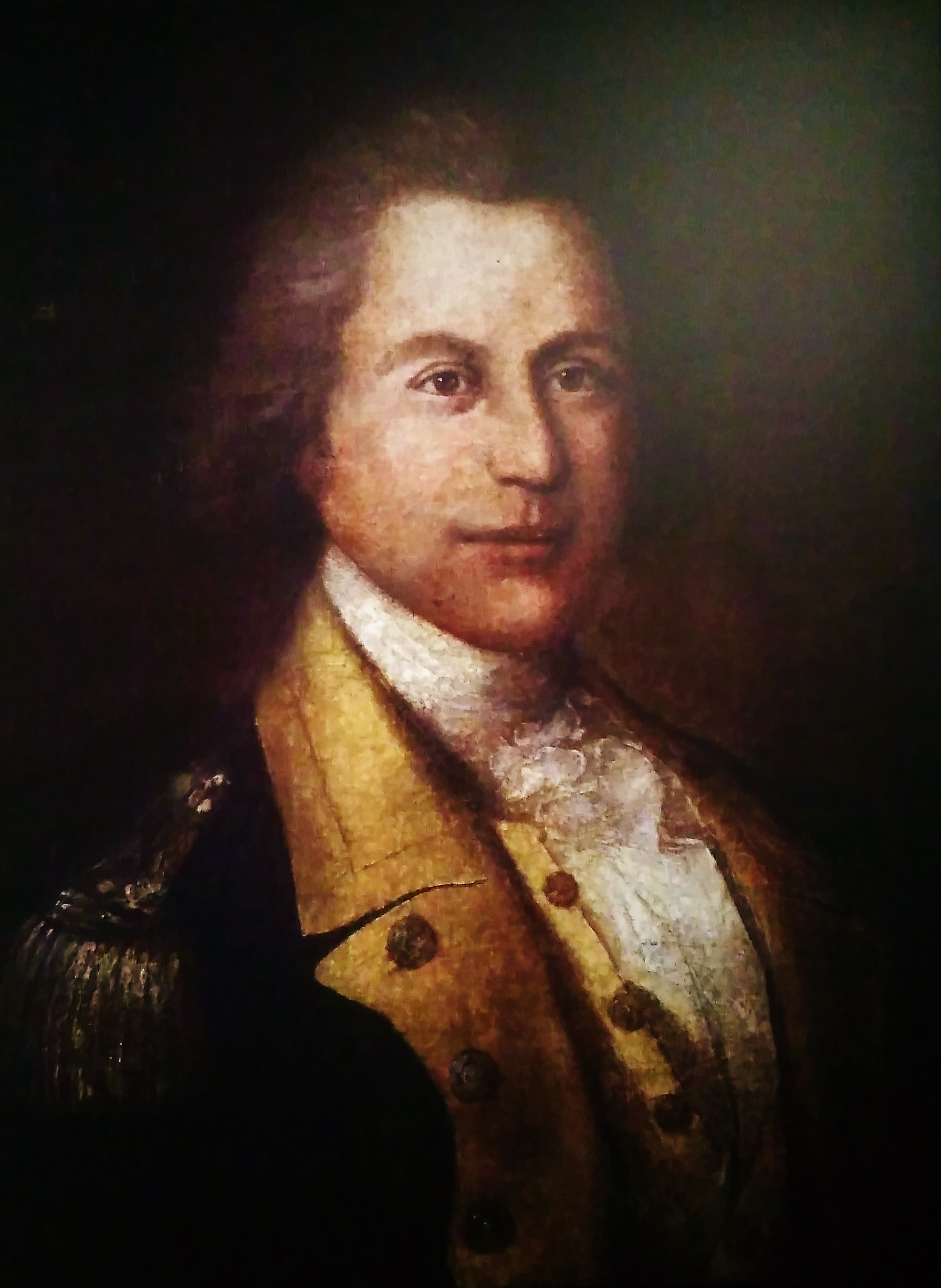
- Portrait of Eugénio dos Santos
- Born: March 1711; Aljubarrota, Kingdom of Portugal
- Died: 25 August 1760 (aged 49); Lisbon, Kingdom of Portugal
- Occupation: Architect
- Projects: Planning and rebuilding of Lisbon's Pombaline Lower Town, Lisbon City Hall, Palácio do Grilo

Eugénio dos Santos de Carvalho (March 1711 – 25 August 1760) was a Portuguese architect and military engineer, responsible for the planning and rebuilding of Lisbon's Pombaline Lower Town after the 1755 earthquake.

== Biography ==
Eugénio dos Santos e Carvalho was born in March 1711 on Rua Direita in the parish of Nossa Senhora dos Prazeres, Aljubarrota, into a family of stonemasons from Mortágua. His father, António dos Santos e Carvalho, had been a stonemason and master draftsman of works, and his paternal grandfather, António de Carvalho, had also been a stonemason. His mother, Francisca Maria, was a native of Aljubarrota.

He was a student at the "Aula de Fortificação e de Arquitectura Militar" (Military Fortification and Architecture School), which he entered in 1735, but by the following year, he was already working on the fortifications of Estremoz, Alentejo, where he was responsible for the construction of the Santa Bárbara Powder Magazine, the Palace, and the Warehouses. Later, he was in charge of the navy fortifications and worked on the construction of the Caldas da Rainha Hospital, under the direction of Manuel da Maia. In 1750, he was appointed inspector of the Court works—including those of the Ribeira Palace and other royal palaces, and architect of the Lisbon Senate.

A trusted man of master Manuel da Maia, the Chief Engineer of the Kingdom, his most notable work was the Praça do Comércio, which opens Lisbon's horizons to the Tagus River.

Among many other works, Eugénio dos Santos designed the reconstruction plan for the capital and directed, along with Carlos Mardel, the works of the Monastery of São Bento da Saúde (the current Assembly of the Republic). He also drew the new plans for the Customshouse (Alfândega), the Arsenal, the Tobacco Factory, and the Ribeira das Naus buildings, as well as the Grilo Palace on the banks of the Tagus. Additionally, he designed the preliminary draft for the statue of King D. José I to be built in Terreiro do Paço, Lisbon, which was authored by the sculptor Joaquim Machado de Castro. In Porto, he designed the Prison and Court of Appeal (Cadeia e Tribunal da Relação).

He married D. Francisca Teresa de Jesus da Costa Negreiros on October 28, 1747, a descendant of an influential family of court architects and daughter of Manuel da Costa Negreiros and Teresa Maria de Jesus.

He died in Lisbon, on Rua da Rosa das Partilhas, in the parish of Mercês, on August 25 1760, aged 59 years old.

Among other buildings he designed the Lisbon City Hall, which was destroyed by fire in 1863. He also designed the Palacio do Grilo, palace of the Lafões family in Lisbon. His austere design for apartment buildings with retail at ground floor level are considered a precursor of functionalist urbanism.
