= Julien Labrousse =

French entrepreneur and architect (born 9 October 1977)

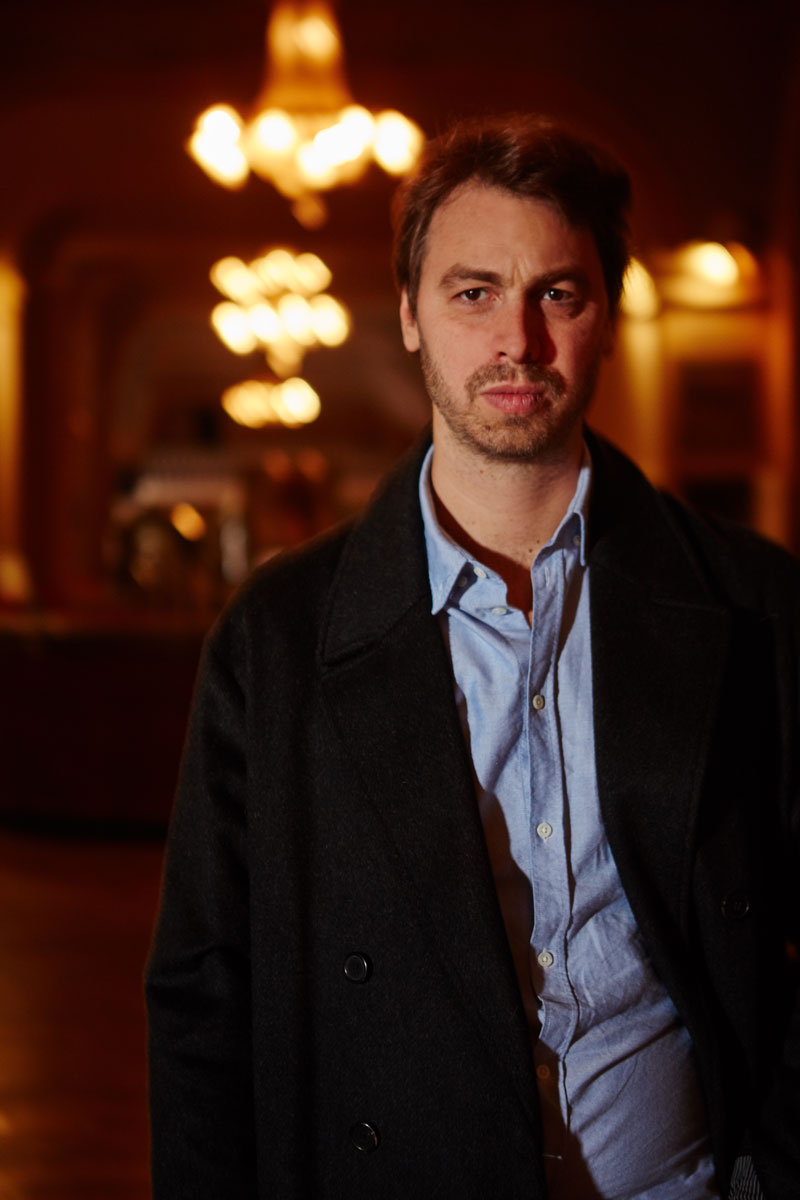
- Born: 9 October 1977 (age 48); Paris, France
- Occupation: Entrepreneur
- Years active: 2005
- Website: policronica.com

Julien Labrousse (born 9 October 1977), is a French entrepreneur and architect. Labrousse is the owner and has renovated several buildings classified as historical monuments including, the L’Hôtel du Nord, the Elysée Montmartre, Le Trianon, and the Palacio do Grilo.

Labrousse operates through a firm called Policronica, which is an architecture and design studio.

== Early life ==
Labrousse was born and raised in Paris, France. He began his professional career very young, working in different small businesses. He also directed several short films and music videos. Then, his professional interests centered on architecture. This topic has always been an integral part of his life, as his father and his mother were architectural book publishers.

== Career ==
=== L’Hôtel du Nord ===
Hôtel du Nord was built around 1914 and originally consisted of three floors and forty modest rooms. It was later listed as a historic monument. In 1929, a novel titled Hôtel du Nord was published, inspired by the establishment's life. In 1938, Marcel Carné adapted the novel into the Hôtel du Nord film and the building became more notable thanks to the film.

In 2005, Labrousse purchased and renovated the Hôtel du Nord building, transforming it into a restaurant, where he took on the role of manager.

=== Le Trianon ===
Le Trianon theatre and concert hall was built in 1894 and is located in the 18th arrondissement of Paris. In 1988, it was included in the inventory of historical monuments. In 2009, Labrousse partnered with film producer Abel Nahmias bought the Le Trianon theatre and applied a complete restoration. It reopened in November 2010 with a series of concerts by artists that included M.I.A., Goldfrapp and Deftones.

=== Elysée Montmartre ===
The Élysée-Montmartre is a Parisian performance hall located on Boulevard Marguerite-de-Rochechouart. Inaugurated in 1807, it has a capacity of 1,380 people. In 1988, the Élysée-Montmartre was classified as a historical monument. Elysée Montmartre is one of the most famous concert venues in Paris where many notable artists performed including, David Bowie, Daft Punk, Björk, Red Hot Chili Peppers, Wu-Tang Clan, Public Enemy and Cyndi Lauper.

On March 22, 2011, around 8 a.m., an electrical fire broke out at the Élysée-Montmartre. It took nearly four hours to bring the fire under control, leading to the closure of the building after the metal structure of the building was damaged.

In 2014, the Élysée-Montmartre was purchased by Julien Labrousse and his partner Abel Nahmias. They have begun the renovation works and the reopening was scheduled for 2016. The Élysée-Montmartre reopened on September 15, 2016, after five years of closure and two and a half years of work. The reopening featured a concert by Matthieu Chedid.

=== Palacio do Grilo ===
Palacio do Grilo was built in the 18th century and predominantly Neoclassic style punctuated by baroque expressions and motifs and was classified as a Public Interest Monument in 2011.

In 2018, Labrousse purchased the Palacio do Grilo and transformed it into a performance theatre, with a restaurant set to open on 20 June 2022. In 2022, Labrousse contributed to the architecture and furniture design of the palace, and in 2023, the project was awarded the Prix Versailles.

== Realisation ==
- Hôtel du Nord, 2005
- Galerie LHK, 2006
- Cococook, 2007
- Chacha, 2008
- Théâtre du Trianon, 2009
- Elysée Montmartre, 2014
- Palacio do Grilo 2022

== Awards and honors ==
In 2023, the project Palacio do Grilo was laureate of the Versailles Prize - the UNESCO World Prize for Architecture and Design. His work on the Élysée-Montmartre has been shortlisted in the "Hotel and Short-Stay Interior" category of the Dezeen Awards 2024. In 2025, Labrousse's work on the Élysée-Montmartre was awarded the ArchDaily's Building of the Year in the category of Hospitality Architecture.
