= Marcel Niedergang =

French journalist and non-fiction author

- Born: September 14, 1922; Évian-les-Bains, France
- Died: December 28, 2001; Neuilly-sur-Seine, France
- Occupation: Journalist

Marcel Niedergang (1922-2001) was a French journalist and non-fiction author.

== Early life ==
Marcel Niedergang was born on September 14, 1922, in Évian-les-Bains, France. He was raised as a Protestant. He studied German at university.

== Career ==
Niedergang started his career as a journalist for Réforme, a Protestant newspaper, in 1949. He joined Le Monde in 1952. He worked for France-Soir from 1956 to 1964. From 1964 to 1975, he worked for Le Monde once again, covering Iberian affairs and Latin America. From 1975 to 1996, he covered foreign affairs for Le Monde. For example, he covered the 1973 Chilean coup d'état and the death of Salvador Allende.

Niedergang was the author of several books. In 1960, he published Tempête sur le Congo, whose main topic was the decolonisation of the Belgian Congo. The book received the Albert Londres Prize in 1961. In 1962, he published Les 20 Amériques latines, a bestseller which was reedited in 1969. In it, he argued that South America was made up of very different former Spanish and Portuguese colonies. He also suggested that Fidel Castro's leadership style was far more comparable to Josip Broz Tito in Yugoslavia or Gamal Abdel Nasser in Egypt than Nikita Khrushchev in the Soviet Union.

In the winter of 1999, Niedergang joined the Collectif Liberté pour l'Afghanistan, an organization lobbying for the West to stop tolerating the Talibans and "Osama bin Laden, the millionaire Saudi financier of terror".

== Personal life ==
Niedergang was married. He spent much of his retirement in Peru.

== Death ==
Niedergang on December 28, 2001, in Neuilly-sur-Seine near Paris, France.
