= Victor Daniel Bonilla =

Colombian investigative journalist

Víctor Daniel Bonilla Sandoval is a Colombian investigative journalist. He was born in Cali in 1933; his family was originally from Cauca. He grew up near Popayán, and moved to Bogotá at the age of 18, where he studied at the National University. He worked as a journalist and editor for 25 years, for newspapers such as El Tiempo and El Espectador, and for journals like La Calle and Gaceta Tercer Mundo. He was chief editor of Revista Alternativa.

He is best known for his 1968 book Siervos de Dios y amos de indios? which was based on extensive travels in the regions of Caquetá, Putumayo and Amazonas. The book examined the negative impact of the local Capuchin mission on native life in Putumayo. The Capuchins had been granted enormous powers in an agreement known as the Concordat of 1887 (the Mission Agreement). The publication of Bonilla's book led to widespread discussion, reaching the highest levels of government and the Vatican, and eventually leading to the cancellation of the agreement in the 1970s.

The book was later translated into French and English, appearing in a Penguin paperback edition under the Pelican Latin American Library imprint.

Bonilla also exposed the presence of a fugitive Nazi in Leticia in the mid-1960s, with the assistance of Héctor Muñoz, a journalist for El Espectador.
