= Maartenscollege, Groningen =

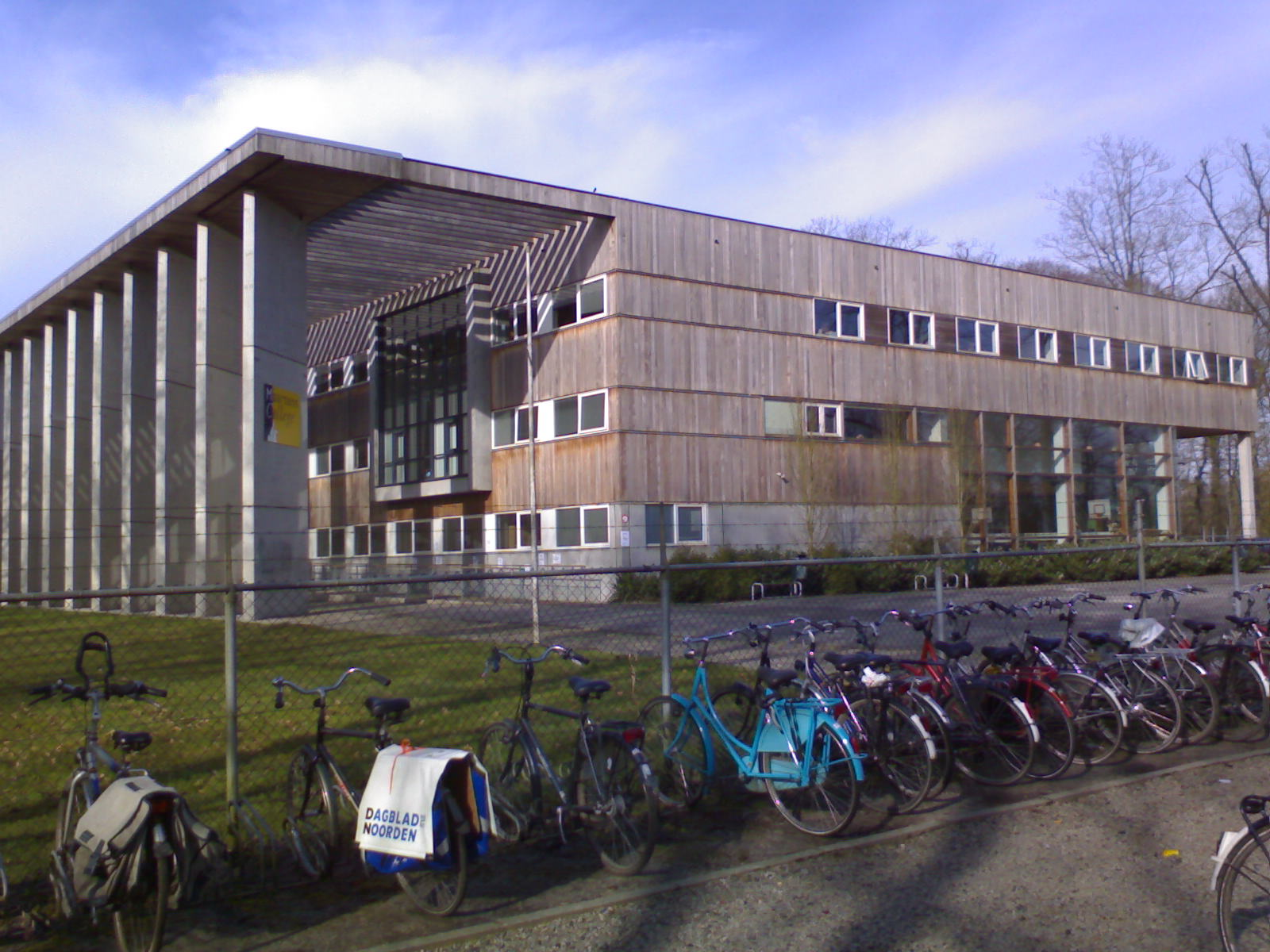

Location
- Haren, Groningen; Netherlands
- Coordinates: 53°11′4″N 6°35′32″E

Information
- Religious affiliation: Christianity
- Established: 1946; 80 years ago
- Rector: T. Zipper
- Staff: 170
- Gender: Coeducational
- Enrollment: 1,600
- Affiliation: Carmel College Foundation
- Website: www.maartenscollege.nl

Maartenscollege, Groningen is a secondary Christian school in the Netherlands. The school was founded by the Society of Jesus in 1946 and is now affiliated with the Carmel College Foundation.

== History ==
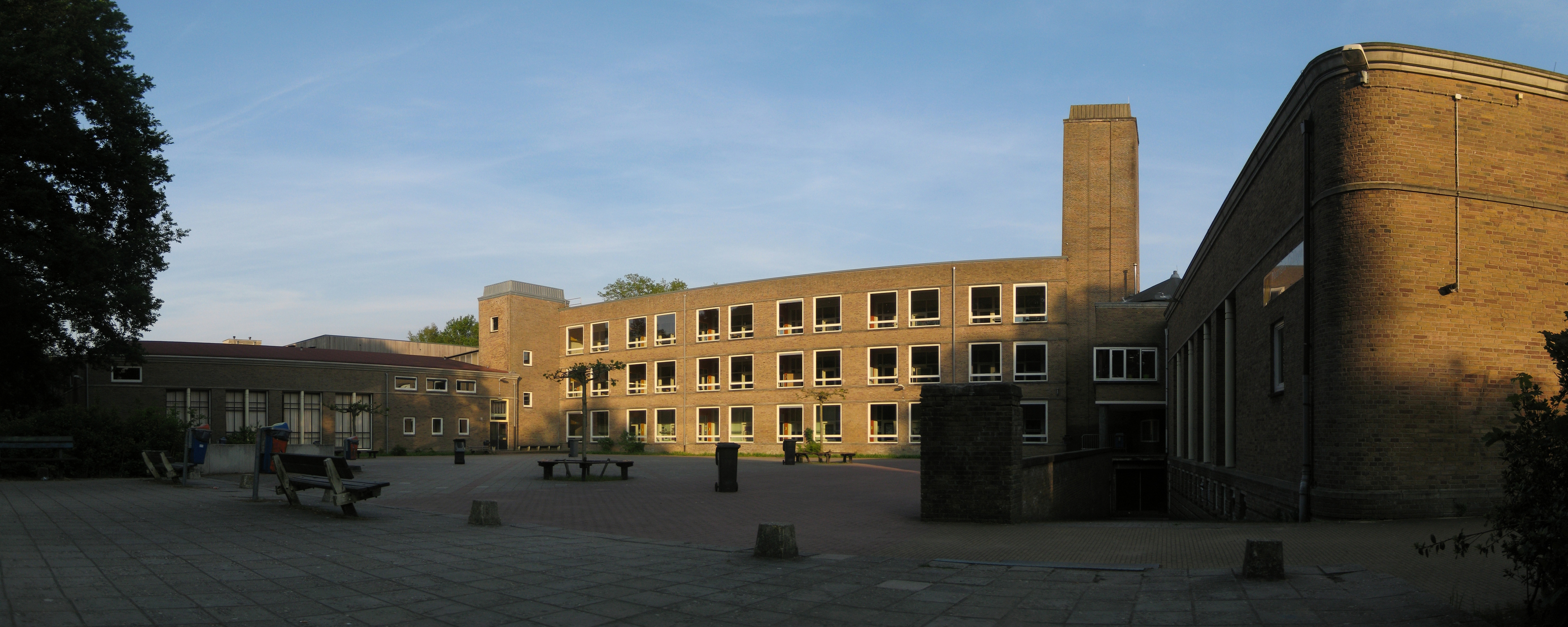

Maartenscollege was founded by the Jesuits in 1946 at the request of the Catholic community in Groningen and the Archdiocese of Utrecht, as there were no Catholic secondary schools in the northeastern part of the Netherlands. The school was built in Haren, just south of the city of Groningen, taking as its patron of the city, St. Martin of Tours.

Between 1959 and 1969, it was a minor seminary for the Diocese of Groningen, with students boarding and attending St. Martin's College in Haren.

In the autumn of 1984, St. Maartenscollege International School was founded as a separate department of St. Maartenscollege, to provide education for international students living in the north of the Netherlands, with English as the language of instruction.

In 1992, St. Maartenscollege merged with Schalm Christian-Protestant secondary school and became an interdenominational school with VMBO, HAVO, atheneum and gymnasium with the shortened name "Maartenscollege". It also has Bilingual Education (TTO), as well as the combination TTO+ (gymnasium and TTO). A partially independent division of Maartenscollege opened in 2005 and is now the International School Groningen, with some classes still taken at the main school. In 1999, the building in Haren had been enlarged to include the Haren and Groningen branches together.

At present, the school has a population of roughly 1400 students and 170 staff members. This includes the International section with a population of 180 students and 30 staff members.

== Activities ==
Maartenscollege has always been a sports school. In the past, the school had its own football club, VMC, which merged with Amicitia in the 1950s. Furthermore, its HMC hockey team has repeatedly won the northern championship.

=== Strikes ===
Maartenscollege even made the news in November 2007 when its students went on several wildcat strikes protesting the 1040 hours norm. Around 15 students were arrested during the protest. Although the college would like to formalize the ideals of the strike, it advocates consultation between the school, the pupils, and the parents.

== Notable alumni ==
- Rob Van Dam (1954), voice actor
- Erick van Egeraat (1956), architect
- Hans van den Hende (1964), bishop
- Francine Houben (1955), architect
- Arjen Lubach (1979), writer and comedian
- Daan Schuurmans (1972), actor
- Tom Snijders (1949), professor
- Driek van Wissen (1943–2010), poet
- Ron Jans (1958), football coach

== See also ==
- List of Jesuit schools
- List of Jesuit sites in the Netherlands
