= Gerrit Huizer =

Dutch writer and scholar

Gerrit Jan Huizer (1929–1999) was a Dutch writer and scholar. He was born in 1929 in Arnhem. He studied at the Municipal University of Amsterdam. Starting in 1955, he lived and worked in various Third World countries for nearly two decades, in places as varied as China, El Salvador, Chile and Mexico. He worked for the UN Economic Commission and for the ILO in Latin America and Southeast Asia. This period gave rise to the book Peasant Unrest in Latin America which was published in Spanish and Dutch, and also in English as part of the Pelican Latin American Library series.

After returning to the Netherlands in the early 1970s, Huizer ran the Third World Center (DWC) and taught at the Catholic University of Nijmegen (KUN). He served as a member of many councils, boards and foundations. Later in life, he wrote the book Learning from the Third World. Crisis as a Challenge (1992). He retired from the KUN in October 1999 and died the following month in Doorwerth.
