= Alain Labrousse =

French sociologist (1937–2016)

Alain Labrousse (19 February 1937 – 6 July 2016) was a French sociologist and journalist who specialized in Latin American politics and the geopolitics of drugs.

== Selected publications ==
He wrote numerous books on Latin America, among them:

- with Alain Hertoghe, Le Sentier lumineux – Un nouvel intégrisme dans le tiers-monde, Paris, La Découverte, 1989, 240 p.
- Le réveil indien en Amérique latine, P.-M. Favre, 1985
- Sur les chemins des Andes, à la rencontre du monde indien, Paris, L'Harmattan, 1983.
- Géopolitique et géostratégie des drogues, with Michel Koutouzis, Economica, coll. « Poche. Géopolitique », 1996
- Géopolitique des drogues, Presses universitaires de France, coll. « Que sais-je ? », 2004 (note de lecture)
- Dictionnaire géopolitique des drogues. La drogue dans 134 pays. Productions, trafics, conflits, usages, Éd. De Boeck
- L'Expérience chilienne : réformisme ou révolution?, Paris, 1972, Éditions du Seuil.
- with François Gèze, Argentine : révolution et contre-révolutions, Paris, 1975, Éditions du Seuil.
- Tupamaros de l'Uruguay, des armes aux urnes, Paris, 2009, Éditions du Rocher.
- Les Tupamaros. Guérilla urbaine en Uruguay, Paris, Éditions du Seuil, 1971.
