= Tjapko =

Tjapko may refer to:

- Tjapko Poppens, a Dutch politician
- Tjapko van Bergen, a Dutch rower
