= Jan Hoffmann (disambiguation) =

Jan Hoffmann may refer to:

- Jan Hoffmann (born 1955), German figure skater
- Jan Hoffmann (Danish footballer) (born 1971), Danish footballer
- Jan Hoffmann (German footballer) (born 1979), German footballer

== See also ==
- Jan Hoffman
- Jann Hoffmann
- Jan Cornelis Hofman
