= Okke Ornstein =

Dutch journalist (born 1965)

- Born: 1965 (age 60–61); Amstelveen, Netherlands
- Occupations: Investigative journalist, TV producer, photographer
- Employer(s): McCann-Erickson, IDTV, NTR
- Known for: Directing commercials, investigative journalism with corruption and fraud
- Partner: Kimberlyn David
- Children: 1
- Awards: Prix Iris
- Website: ornstein.org

Okke Ornstein (born 1965), is a Dutch investigative journalist who is known for his fraud and corruption investigations. Ornstein was imprisoned in Panama in 2016, and was released after serving more than one month in prison. Ornstein's fraud and corruption investigation has won several awards, including the Prix Europa. Ornstein has produced major stories through NTR and Al Jazeera. Ornstein previously published through his own site Bananama Republic but now publishes for Correspondent at Large..

== Personal life ==
Ornstein was born in the Amstelveen, North Holland in 1965. He began his career in advertising. He also worked as a television producer and photographer. He first went to Panama to report in 2000. Prior to his 2016 arrest, he had been a resident in Panama for several years. He has a teenage daughter who lives in Panama and is in a relationship with Kimberlyn David.

== Arrest ==
In 2012, Ornstein faced backlash after publishing a number of pieces on fraud and corruption through his website Bananama Republic, where he wrote about criminal activity. In one case, Ornstein wrote about the alleged fraudulent business practices of Monte Friesner, a citizen in Panama. Friesner allegedly had a criminal history dating back to 1966, and has been convicted on counts of money laundering, wire transfers, and other crimes. Friesner filed a complaint regarding Ornstein's posts, and Ornstein was prosecuted by Panamanian officials. Ornstein was convicted of criminal defamation and sentenced to a 20-month sentence in 2012. This sentence was never implemented and Ornstein lived freely in Panama following the conviction.

Ornstein travelled between the Netherlands and Panama several times between 2012 and 2016. When Ornstein arrived at Panama International Airport on 16 November 2016, he was arrested on account of his 2012 conviction. Several organizations worked to secure Ornstein freedom, including the Dutch Association and the International Federation of Journalists, who claimed the charges against him were unfounded. After a presidential decree by President Juan Carlos Varela, Ornstein was released from jail along with over 300 other prisoners on 23 December 2016 and his sentence was commuted. Ornstein has since started a new website, called Correspondent at Large.

== Responses ==
Panama City is the capital of Panama.

Ornstein's arrest lead to a number of responses internationally. International Press Institute Executive Director Barbara Trionfi stated the imprisonment was "appalling" because it took place before an anti-corruption gathering of experts in Panama. The External managing director of Transparency International, Cobus de Swardt, said "Journalists play an important role in showing that the corrupt cannot get away with their crimes. It’s no time to be incarcerating the messengers." Thomas Bruning from the Dutch Journalist Association supported Ornstein arguing that "A 20 month prison sentence over a series of blog posts is against the fundamental principles of freedom of speech and freedom of expression, principles that are acknowledged as fundamental rights world wide."

== Awards ==
Ornstein has won a number of awards for his work in journalism. The first was the Prix Europa in 2013 for a radio investigation piece regarding the environmental impact of a hydroelectric dam in Panama. Ornstein was nominated for the Tegel Award in 2015 for a radio documentary about refugees. Ornstein has also won the Prix Iris for his documentary series "Urbania."

== See also ==
- Day of the Imprisoned Writer
- Journalism ethics and standards
- Panama Papers
