= Amsterdamseweg =

Street in Amstelveen, Netherlands

The Amsterdamseweg is an important street in Amstelveen, Netherlands. It is one of the oldest streets in the city.

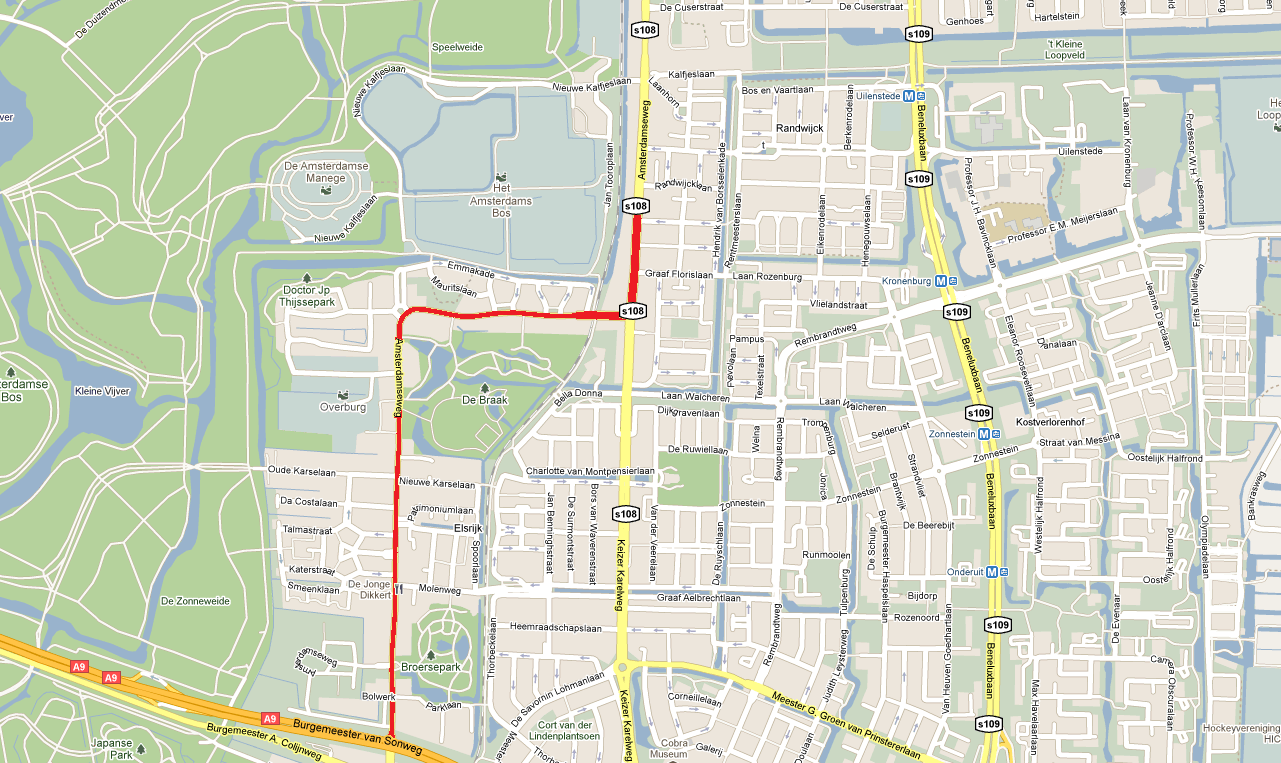
Amsterdamseweg marked in red

As shown on old prints, the Amsterdamseweg is built on an old dike.

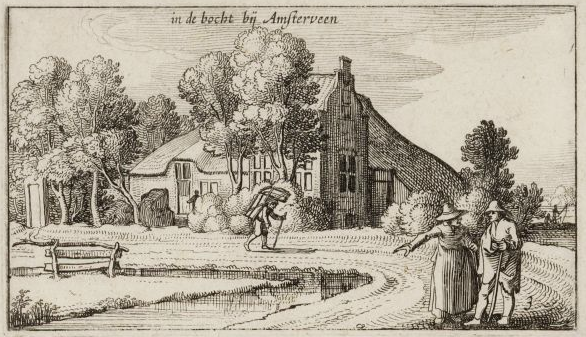
Amsterdamseweg 1608 (ca.)

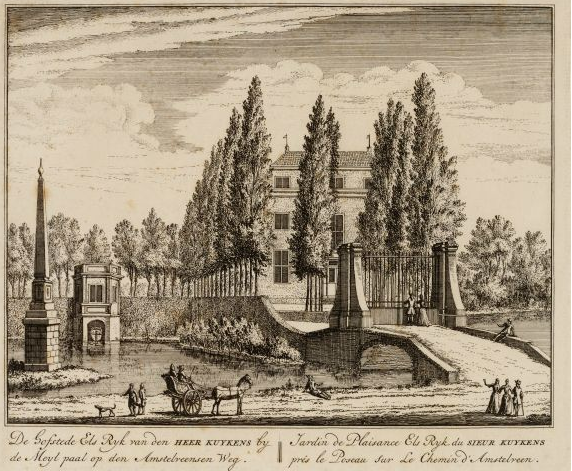
Amsterdamseweg 1728

This dike was built to prevent the area from getting flooded by the nearby Haarlemmermeer. Nowadays, the houses are built up against the dike, that's why the houses of the Amsterdamseweg have a souterrain.

== Monuments ==
- Amsterdamseweg 60; 62; 64; 66 two twin houses
- Amsterdamseweg 104A (Wood saw) mill 'The Dikkert' with two attached barns (1672)
- Amsterdamseweg 204 Van Leer's office with freestanding chimney (1957)
- Amsterdamseweg, near 212 banpole (1559)
- Amsterdamseweg 419; 421; 421a Collection Bank (1938)

One of the largest monuments on the Amsterdamseweg is the banpole (1559).

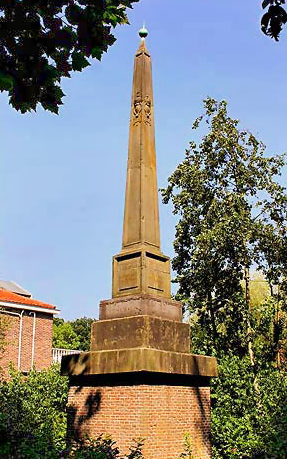
Banpole Amsterdamseweg
