= Guido van Rijn =

Dutch blues and gospel historian

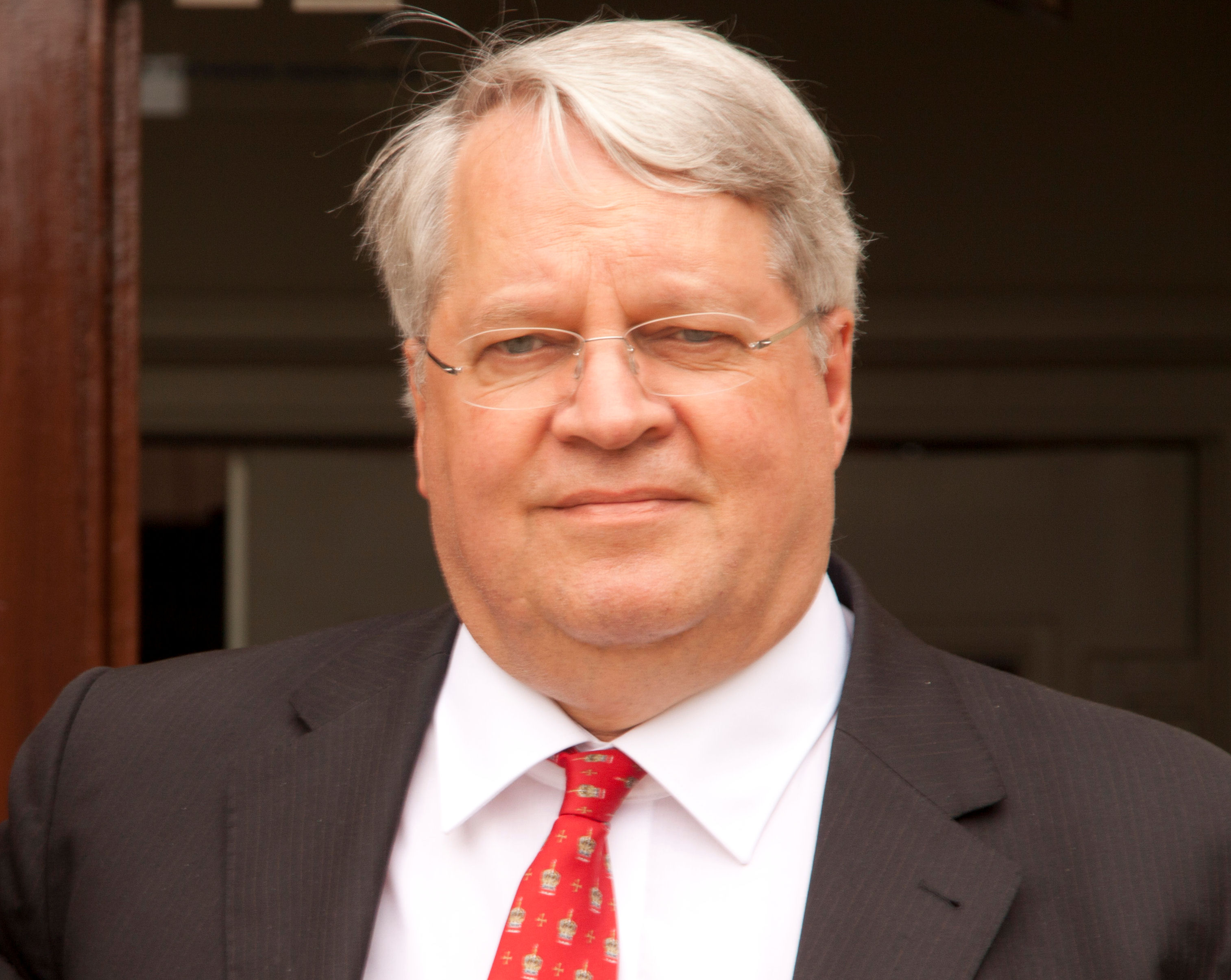

Guido van Rijn (11 April 1950) is a Dutch blues and gospel historian.

== Biography ==
Van Rijn received his Ph.D. from Leiden University in 1995 for Roosevelt's Blues: African-American Blues and Gospel Songs on FDR. Two years later the commercial edition of this dissertation was published by the University Press of Mississippi with the same title. In 2004 The Truman and Eisenhower Blues: African-American Blues and Gospel Songs, 1945-1960 was published by Continuum. The third volume of Guido van Rijn's research into blues and gospel singers' reactions to American politics appeared as Kennedy's Blues: African-American Blues and Gospel Songs on JFK (University Press of Mississippi, 2007).

The final three volumes were published by Agram Blues Books: President Johnson's Blues (2009), The Nixon and Ford Blues (2011) and The Carter, Reagan, Bush Sr., Clinton, Bush Jr. & Obama Blues (2012). These six volumes are all accompanied by Agram CDs presenting examples of the songs analyzed in the books.

In 1970, Van Rijn was co-founder of the Nederlandse Blues en Boogie Organisatie (NBBO). In the seventies he organized a great many concerts by African-American blues artists in the Netherlands, at first in Amstelveen, and subsequently in Amsterdam and Groningen; these culminated in the renowned Blues Estafette, the sequel to the 1979 NBBO Festival in Utrecht.

With Alex van der Tuuk van Rijn wrote an illustrated, five-volume discography of the Paramount blues label for Agram Blues Books: New York Recording Laboratories L Matrix Series (2011), New York Recording Laboratories 20000 & Gennett Matrix Series (2012), New York Recording Laboratories Rodeheaver, Marsh & 2000 Series (2013) and NYRL 1100-1999 Matrix Series (2014). The final volume, NYRL 1-1099 Matrix Series, was published in 2015.

Van Rijn regularly writes for specialist blues magazines. After his retirement in 2015 as a teacher of English at Kennemer Lyceum in Overveen, the Netherlands, he remains curator of the school archive. In 2020, his school existed one hundred years. On this occasion Van Rijn published the book, 100 Years Kennemer Lyceum: The history of a special school (Haarlem: Loutje, 2020). In 2021 Van Rijn started a series of biographies of blues artists: The Texas Blues of Smokey Hogg (2021), The St. Louis Piano Blues of Walter Davis (2022), The Naptown Blues of Leroy Carr (2022), The Chicago Blues of Washboard Sam (2023), The Chicago Blues of Jazz Gillum (2023), and The Chicago Blues of Joe and Charlie McCoy (2024). In 2024 he also published a fully updated second edition of the late Max Vreede's classic 1971 discography Paramount 12000/13000 series.

Van Rijn received ARSC (Association for Recorded Sound Collections) awards for Roosevelt's Blues (1997) and The Texas Blues of Smokey Hogg (2021). In 2015 he was awarded a "lifetime achievement" KBA (Keeping the Blues Alive) award in Memphis, Tennessee in the category "historical preservation". In 2013 he was "Bloemendaler of the year" (Overveen is part of the village of Bloemendaal). In 2024 he received a Lifetime Achievement Award from the Association for Recorded Sound Collections (ARSC). Guido van Rijn is a Knight in the Order of Oranje-Nassau.
