= Arend Jan Boekestijn =

Dutch politician (born 1959)

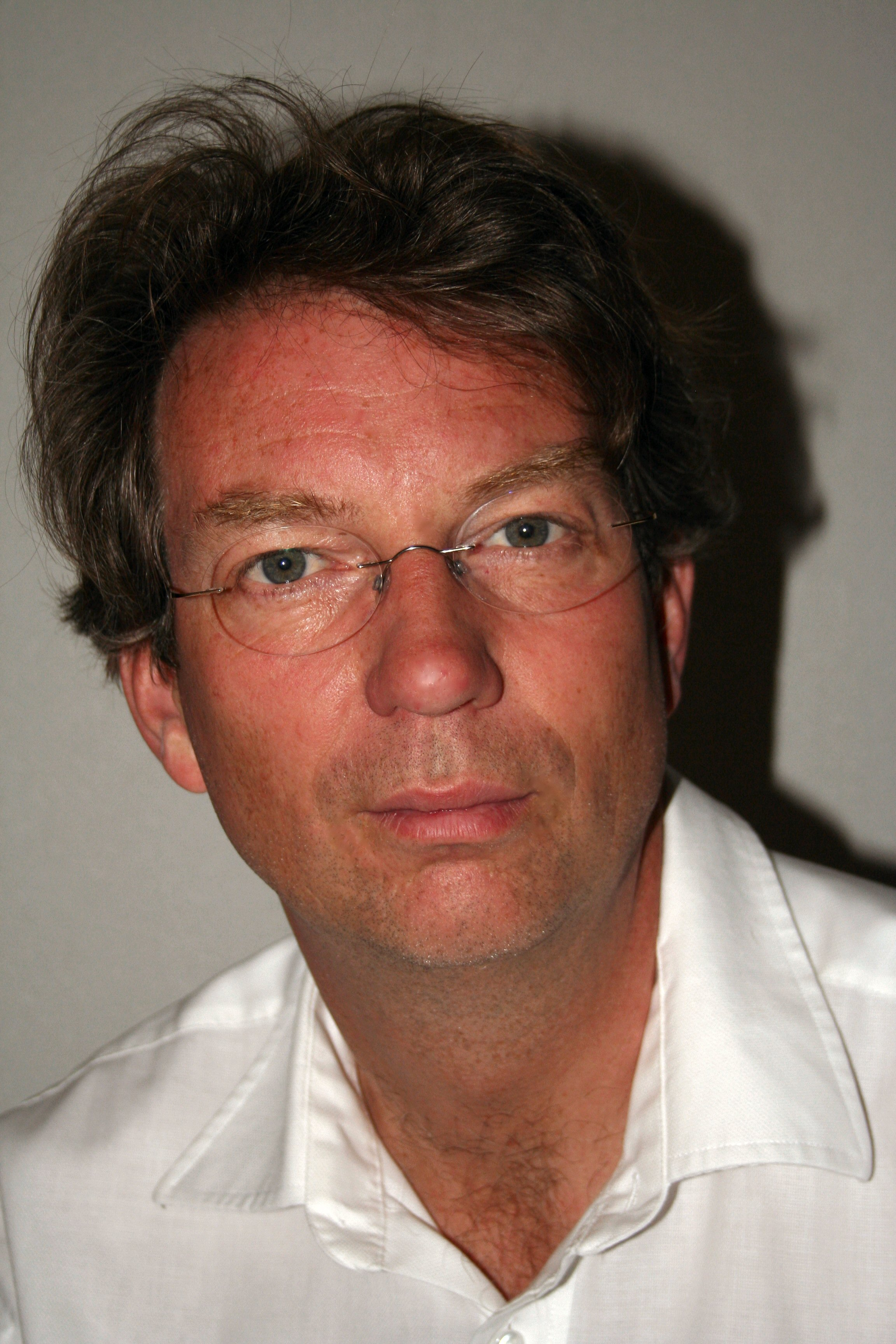

Arend Johannes "Arend Jan" Boekestijn (born 27 September 1959 in Amstelveen) is a Dutch historian and former politician, who was a member of the Dutch House of Representatives on behalf of the People's Party for Freedom and Democracy (VVD) from 30 November 2006 through 18 November 2009. He resigned after sharing information with the press regarding a confidential conversation with the Queen of the Netherlands.
