= Rietwijkeroord =

- Former hamlet and former municipality
- Country: Netherlands
- Province: North Holland

Rietwijkeroord is a former hamlet in the Dutch province of North Holland. It was located in the current municipality of Amstelveen, and was also known as "Rijkeroord" or "Het Schiphol".

Rietwijkeroord was a separate municipality between 1817 and 1854, when it was merged with Nieuwer-Amstel. The municipality covered the area that is now the northern half of the Amsterdamse Bos, north of the A9 highway. Around 1850, it had a population of only 90 inhabitants.
