= Amstelveen =

- Municipality
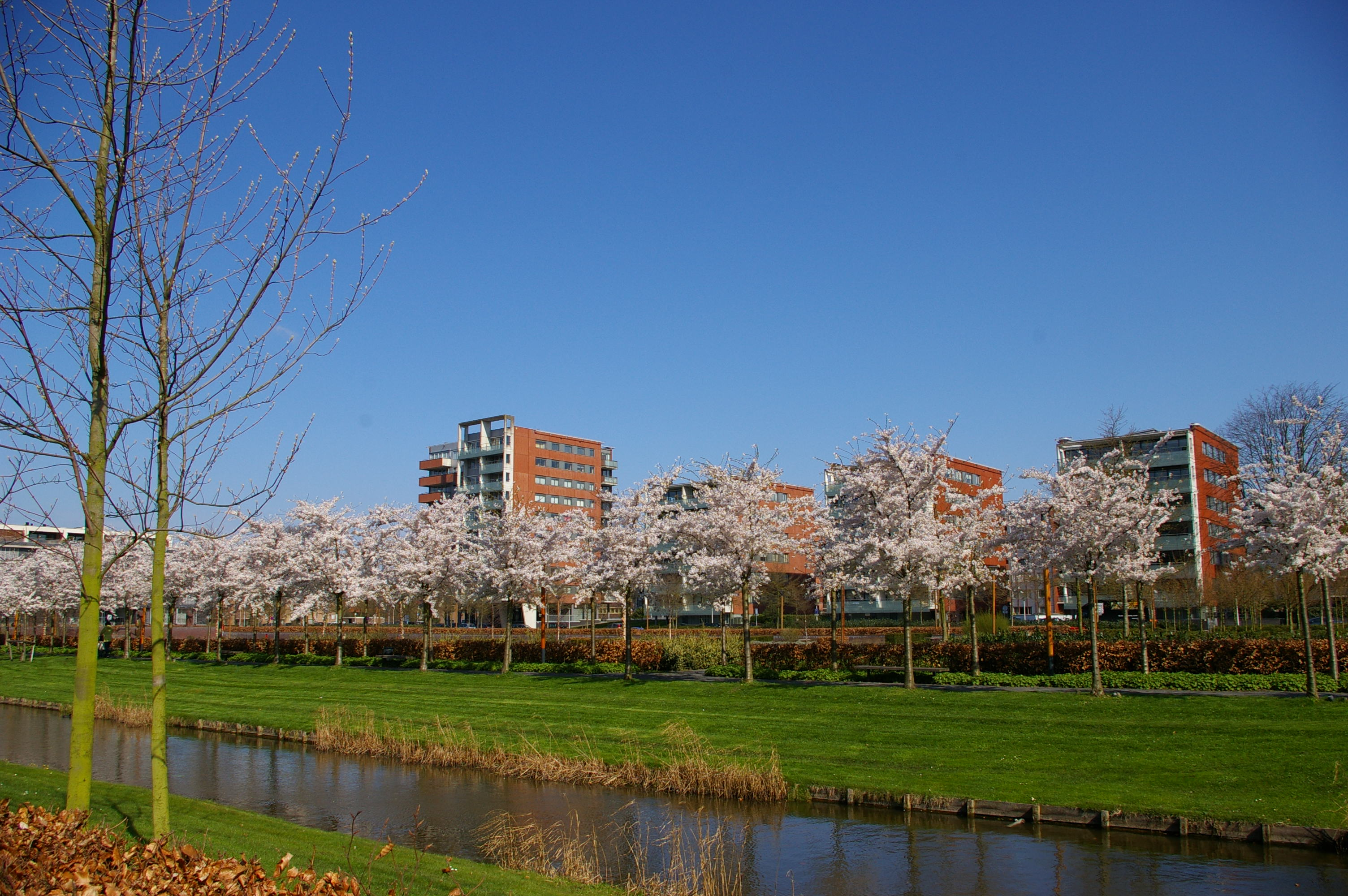
- Apartment buildings in Amstelveen

- Flag Coat of arms

- Location in North Holland
- Coordinates: 52°18′N 4°51′E
- Country: Netherlands
- Province: North Holland
- Region: Amsterdam metropolitan area

Government
  - Body: Municipal council
  - Mayor: Tjapko Poppens (VVD)

Area
  - Total: 44.08 km^{2} (17.02 sq mi)
  - Land: 41.13 km^{2} (15.88 sq mi)
  - Water: 2.95 km^{2} (1.14 sq mi)
- Elevation: −1 m (−3.3 ft)

Population (January 2021)
  - Total: 90,829
  - Density: 2,208/km^{2} (5,720/sq mi)
- Demonym: Amstelvener
- Time zone: UTC+1 (CET)
  - Summer (DST): UTC+2 (CEST)
- Postcode: 1180–1189
- Area code: 020
- Website: www.amstelveen.nl

Amstelveen (Dutch pronunciation: [ˌɑmstəlˈveːn]) is a municipality and city in the province of North Holland, Netherlands, with a population of 95,996 as of 2024. It is a suburban part of the Amsterdam metropolitan area.

The municipality of Amstelveen consists of the historical villages of Bovenkerk and Nes aan de Amstel. In addition, as well as Downtown Amstelveen (Dutch: Amstelveen stadshart), it contains the following neighbourhoods: Westwijk, Bankras-Kostverloren, Groenelaan, Waardhuizen, Middenhoven, Randwijk, Elsrijk and Keizer Karelpark. The name Amstelveen comes from the Amstel, a local river (as does the name Amsterdam) and veen, meaning fen, peat, or moor. Amstelveen houses the international headquarters of Dutch national airline KLM (although it is slated to leave for Schiphol in the future, plans to move have been delayed due to COVID and high costs) and KPMG, one of the Big Four accounting firms. The Cobra Museum is also located in Amstelveen.

== History ==
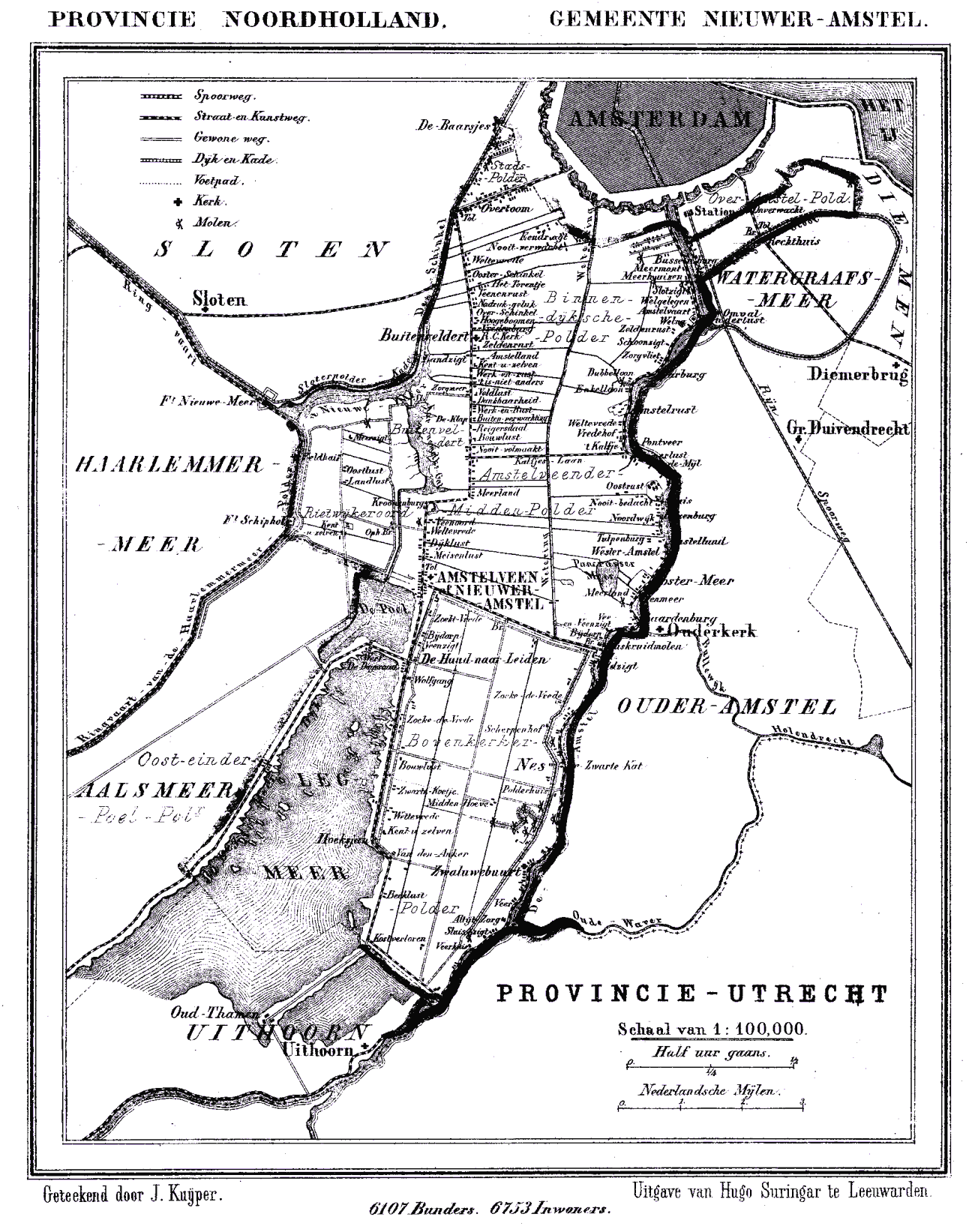
Map of Nieuwer-Amstel, 1865–1870

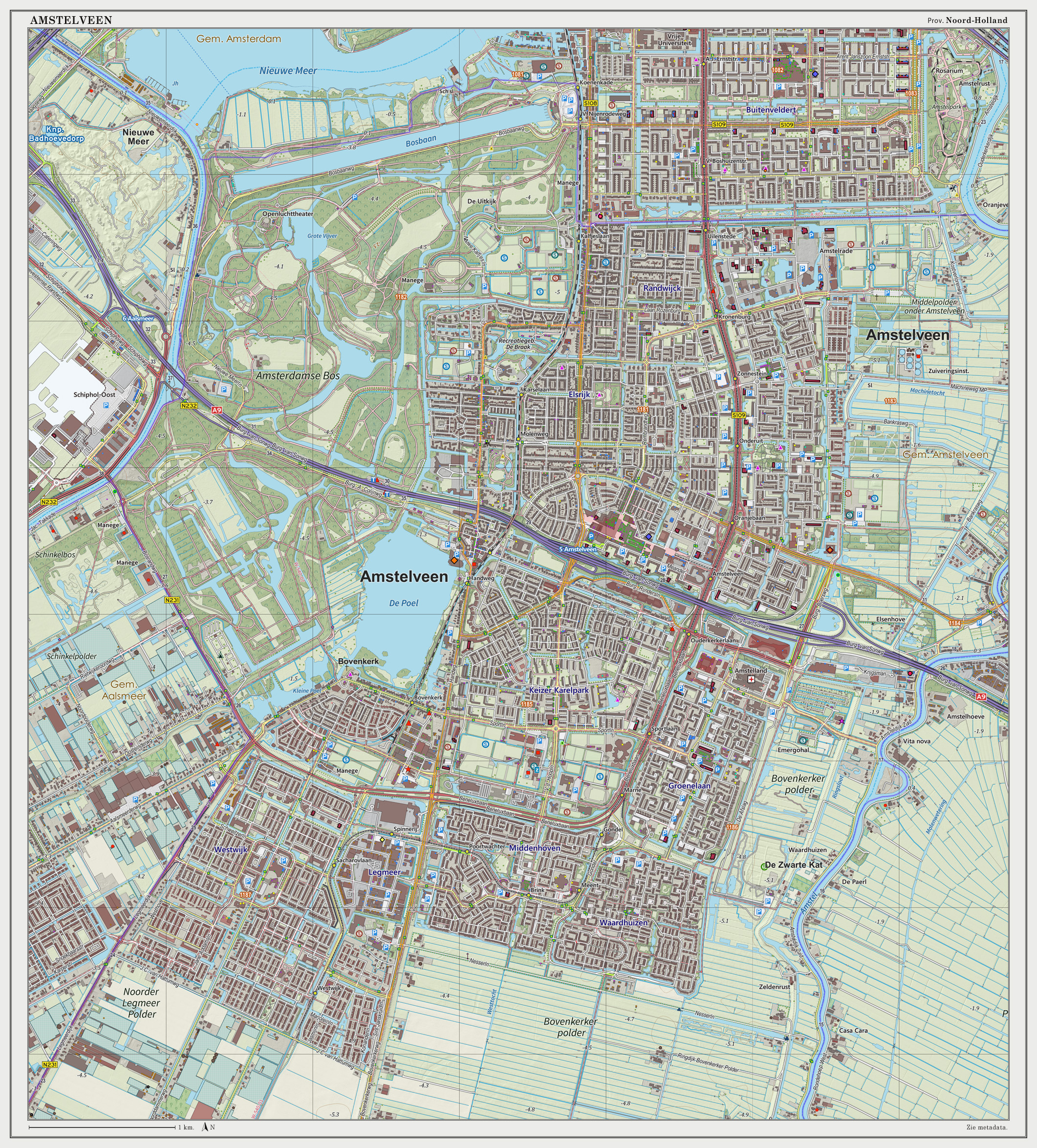
Topographic map of Amstelveen, September 2014

During the French occupation between 1810 and 1814, Amstelveen was the capital of a canton in the French department Zuyderzée, and until 1964 the municipality of Amstelveen was called Nieuwer-Amstel. It is technically a large dorp (village), because it was never walled. The Amstelveen flag and coat of arms, both present 5 strips in a red, black, red, black, red pattern, with three crosses on the top black strip, and a single cross in the middle of the lower black strip. The symbols bear great similarity to that of Amsterdam's, though the exact nature of the relationship remains unclear. The Thijssepark (in full the Dr Jac. P. Thijssepark), was the first heempark in the Netherlands, and is one of sixteen heemparks or heemgroen in Amstelveen. Designed by landscape architect C. P. Broerse, following the ideas of the great Dutch naturalist and conservationist Jac. P. Thijsse, it was developed between 1940 and 1972 and covers an area of 5 hectares (about 12 acres), and is situated just south of the Amsterdamse Bos. Amstelveen was chosen as an unlikely host of a match in the 1999 Cricket World Cup, for which the Netherlands had not qualified. South Africa played Kenya in the match. Former Dutch prime minister Jan Peter Balkenende started his political career as member of the council for Amstelveen. As a result of the vicinity of Schiphol (Amsterdam Airport), and its links to Amsterdam, Amstelveen has grown and become a cosmopolitan mix of many cultures.

In the early 20th century Amstelveen was a small rural village. The turf industry had collapsed, so the village had lost its revenues from it. The village was somewhat isolated, because it had no major railway or waterway. The main source of income was livestock farming, with some arable, but horticulture and floriculture were already emerging.

In 1852 the Haarlemmermeer polder was reclaimed and the "Fort at the Schiphol" was created as a defense for Amsterdam. Forts were in those days more often named after rivers. "Fort at the Schiphol" was a ditch separating Aalsmeer and Amstelveen, and named after a piece of land from Amstelveen. Fort Schiphol became a military airport in 1916. Four years later Schiphol became a civilian airport. Schiphol Fort was demolished in 1934 to build a provincial road (Mayor Van Sonweg) from Amstelveen to Schiphol, with a swing bridge over the circular canal of the Haarlemmermeer. The development of Schiphol Airport attracted many people, many of whom settled in Amstelveen. The headquarters of KLM was established there. Amstelveen once was the fastest growing city in the Netherlands and has now grown to 91,691 inhabitants (2020).

After World War II Amstelveen caught a portion of Amsterdam's housing shortage, and was also a member of the municipality of Schiphol. Amsterdam's plan was to introduce Amstelveen as a metropolitan area, with its urban and green areas. Amstelveen remained an independent and self-conscious municipality and adopted a policy that reflected many attractive new residential areas. Amstelveen's landscaping and added art attracted much international attention.

In 1993, Amstelveen was in the news for its Krokettenmotie, debated in the municipal council after a motion proposal by Jan Peter Balkenende. In 2004 Amstelveen was voted the most attractive city in the Netherlands in which to live. Currently Amstelveen is in the top three on the national list of best cities to live in. The Amstelveen city centre also received the number one award for the Netherlands' best shopping centre in 2013, 2014 and 2015.

In 2018 the St. Urbanus Church (Sint-Urbanuskerk) in Bovenkerk caught fire. The tower remained standing but the rest of the church suffered severe damage.

The city's close proximity to Schiphol Airport makes it a prime location for people working in the aviation industry.

== Economy ==
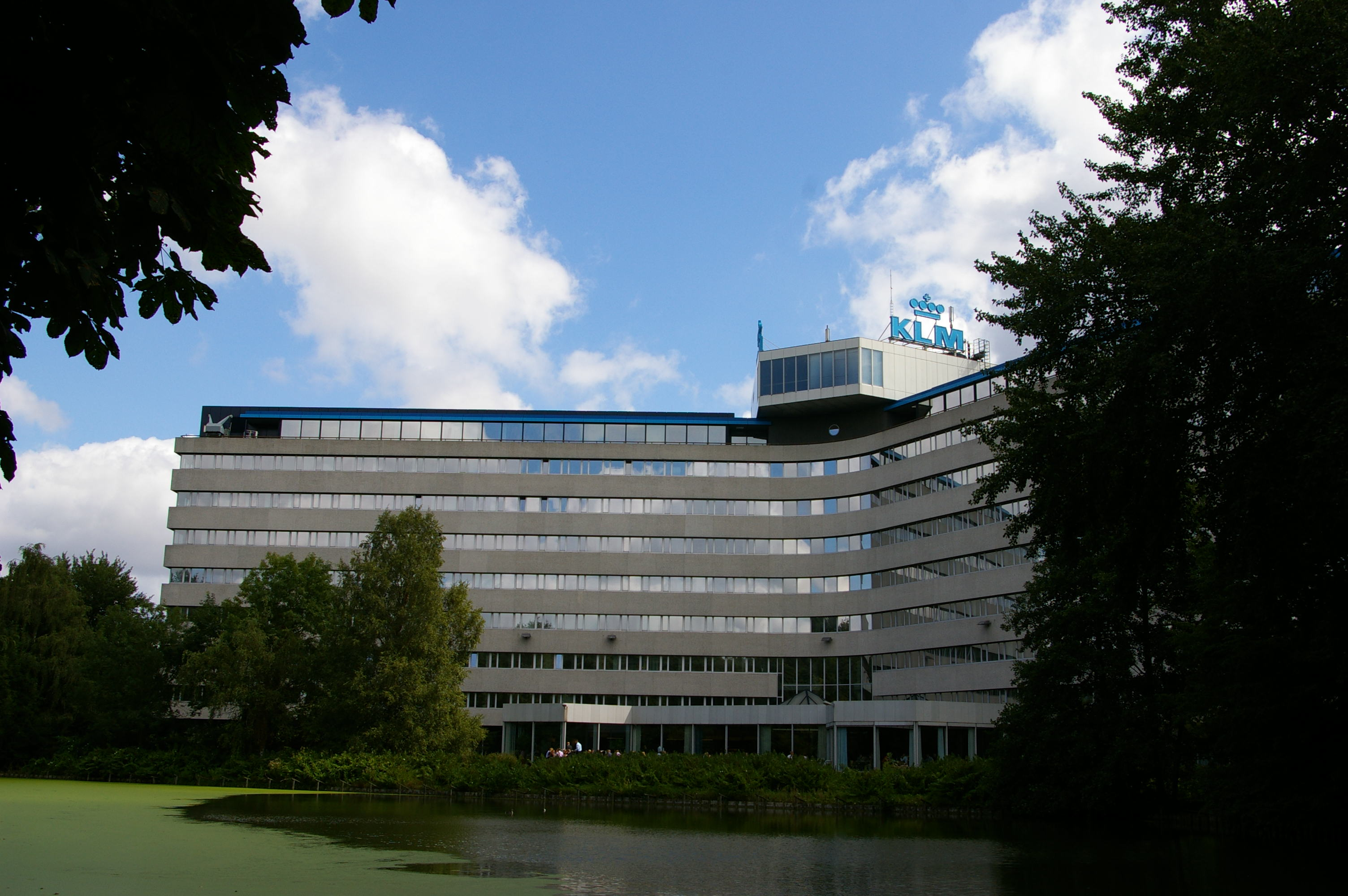
KLM head office

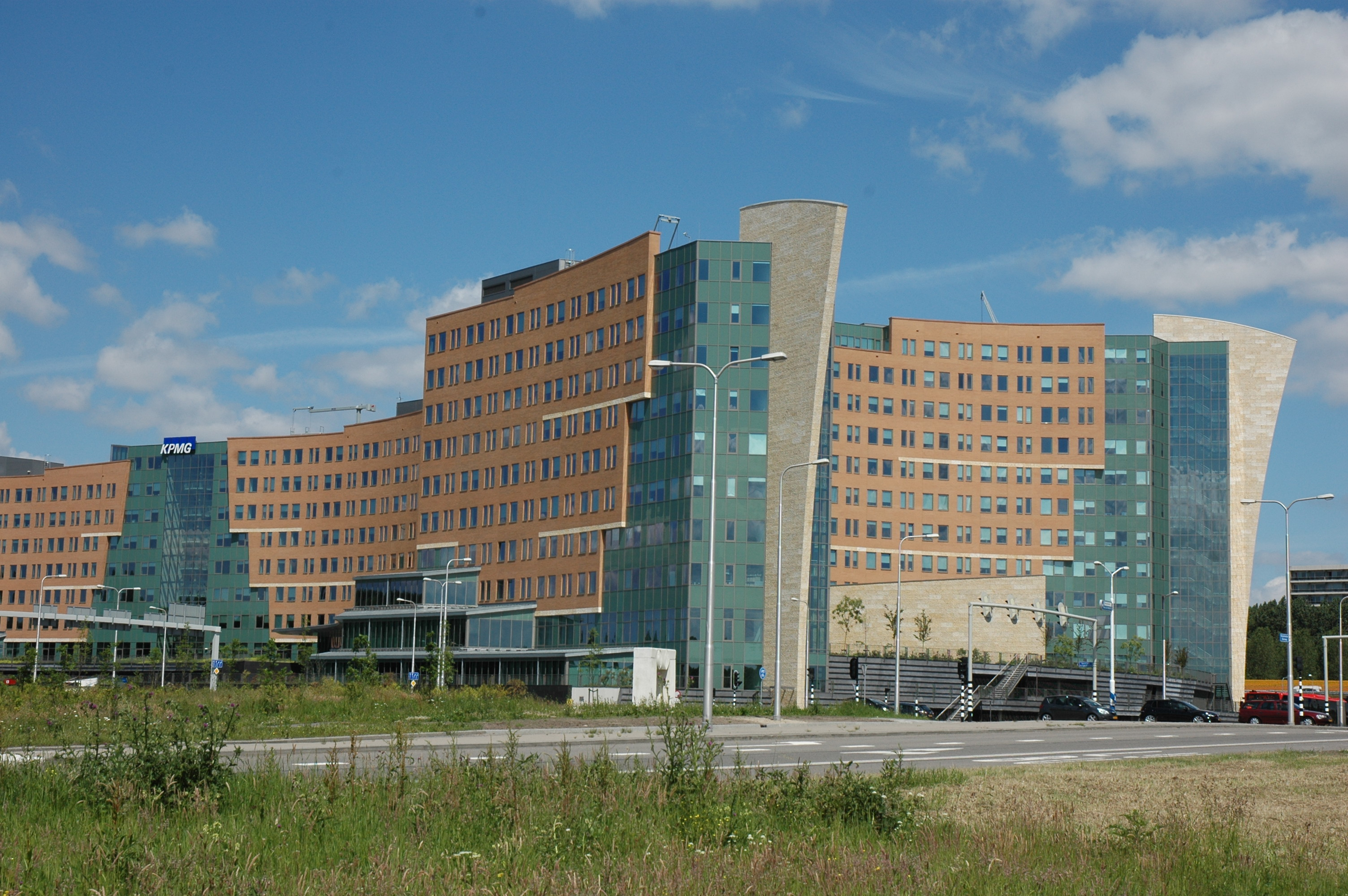
KPMG head office

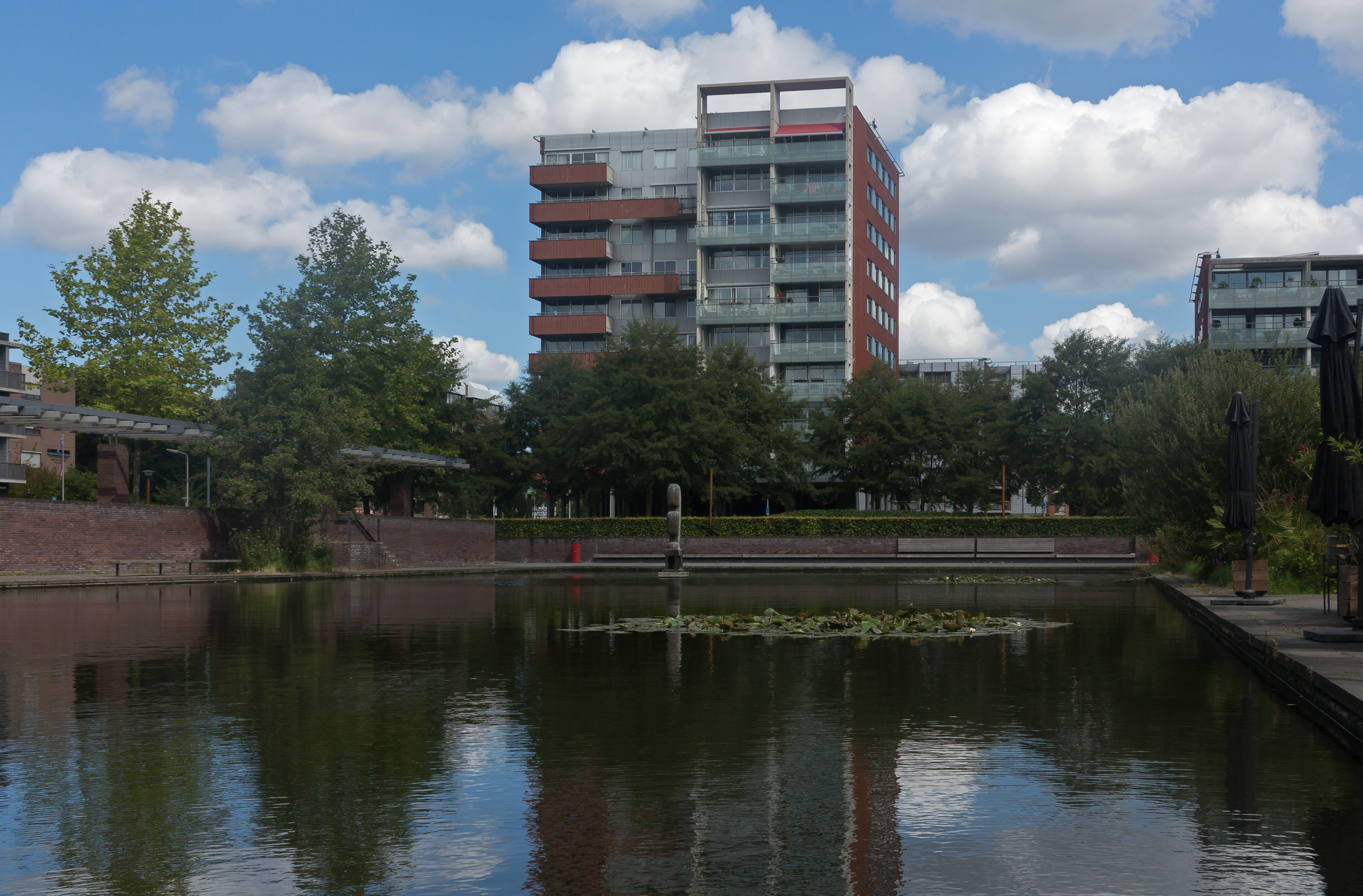
Downtown Amstelveen

KLM Royal Dutch Airlines as well as the commercial organisation for the Netherlands, Belgium and Luxembourg have their head offices in Amstelveen (52.306117°N 4.842954°E), although it is slated to leave in the future. Air France-KLM is represented by the KLM head office.

In addition, Amstelveen houses the international headquarters of Big Four accounting firm KPMG. Large international corporations such as Nestlé, Canon and Hewlett-Packard also have corporate offices in Amstelveen.

== Transport ==
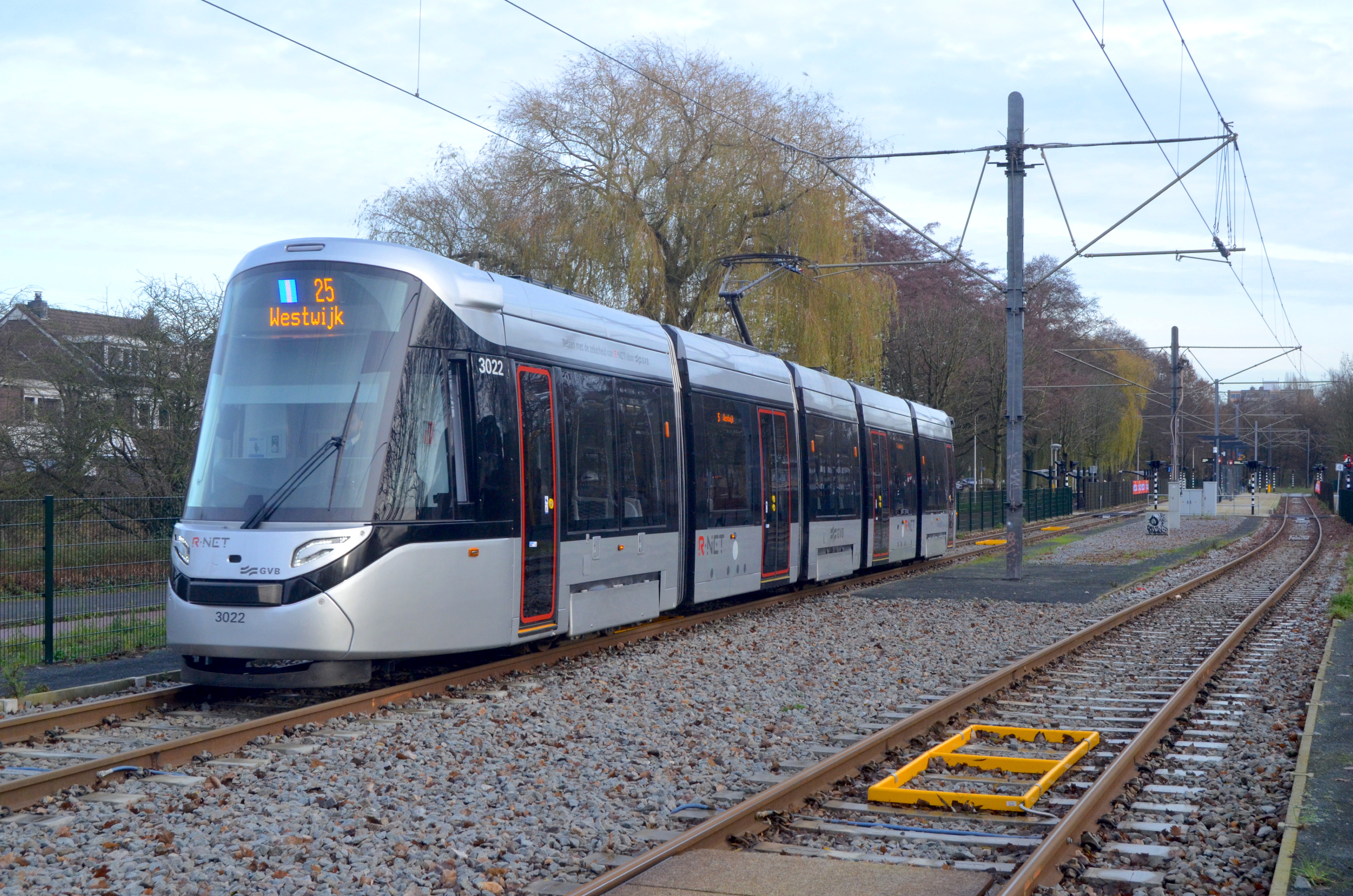
Line 25 tram leaving the Amstelveen Poortwachter stop

Amstelveen is served by two tram lines running south from Amsterdam Zuid station. Tram line 5 runs south via Amsterdam Zuid to Stadshart (city centre) in Amstelveen. Tram line 25 runs between Amsterdam Zuid station and Uithoorn Centrum. Both tram lines serve stops between Amsterdam Zuid and Oranjebaan. Tram line 25 replaced a portion of Metro line 51 that used to run between Amsterdam Zuid station and Westwijk.

Amstelveen has a point-to-point bus connection to other villages and Amsterdam Airport Schiphol as well as a local network. There is also an extensive bus system.

== Tourism and attractions ==
- Shopping Amstelveen city centre. This has received the number one award for best shopping center in the Netherlands in 2013, 2014 and 2015
- Cobra Museum is located in the centre (Stadshart) of Amstelveen.
- Museum Jan, is centrehousing a glass art collection
- A statue of Rembrandt overlooks the river Amstel, south east from the Amstelpark, where a windmill open to visitors is also situated
- On the Amstel river is a cheese farm called Rembrandt Hoeve. It is about 1 mile from the Rembrandt Statue, accessible by bike, boat, car or bus.
- An Electric Museum-tram line still connects Amstelveen to Amsterdam in the summer, passing by the Amsterdamse Bos and Olympic rowing lake

== Secondary education ==
- The Hermann Wesselink College offers vmbo-tl, havo, vwo (gymnasium and atheneum) and bilingual education
- The Keizer Karel College offers havo and vwo (atheneum, gymnasium and technasium).
- The Amstelveen College offers vmbo-tl, havo, and vwo (atheneum and gymnasium)
- The Panta Rhei offers vmbo, optionally with leerwegondersteunend onderwijs (literally, "learning path–supporting education")

=== Other education ===
- The International School Amsterdam is located in Amstelveen.

== Local government ==
The municipal council of Amstelveen consists of 37 seats, which at the 2026 elections divided as follows:

- GroenLinks / PvdA – 9 seats
- VVD – 9 seats
- D66 – 7 seats
- Actief voor Amstelveen (AvA) - 4 seats
- Forum voor Democratie – 2 seats
- Burgerbelangen Amstelveen – 2 seats
- SP – 1 seat
- CDA – 1 seat
- Goed voor Amstelveen – 1 seat
- 50PLUS – 1 seat

== Notable people ==
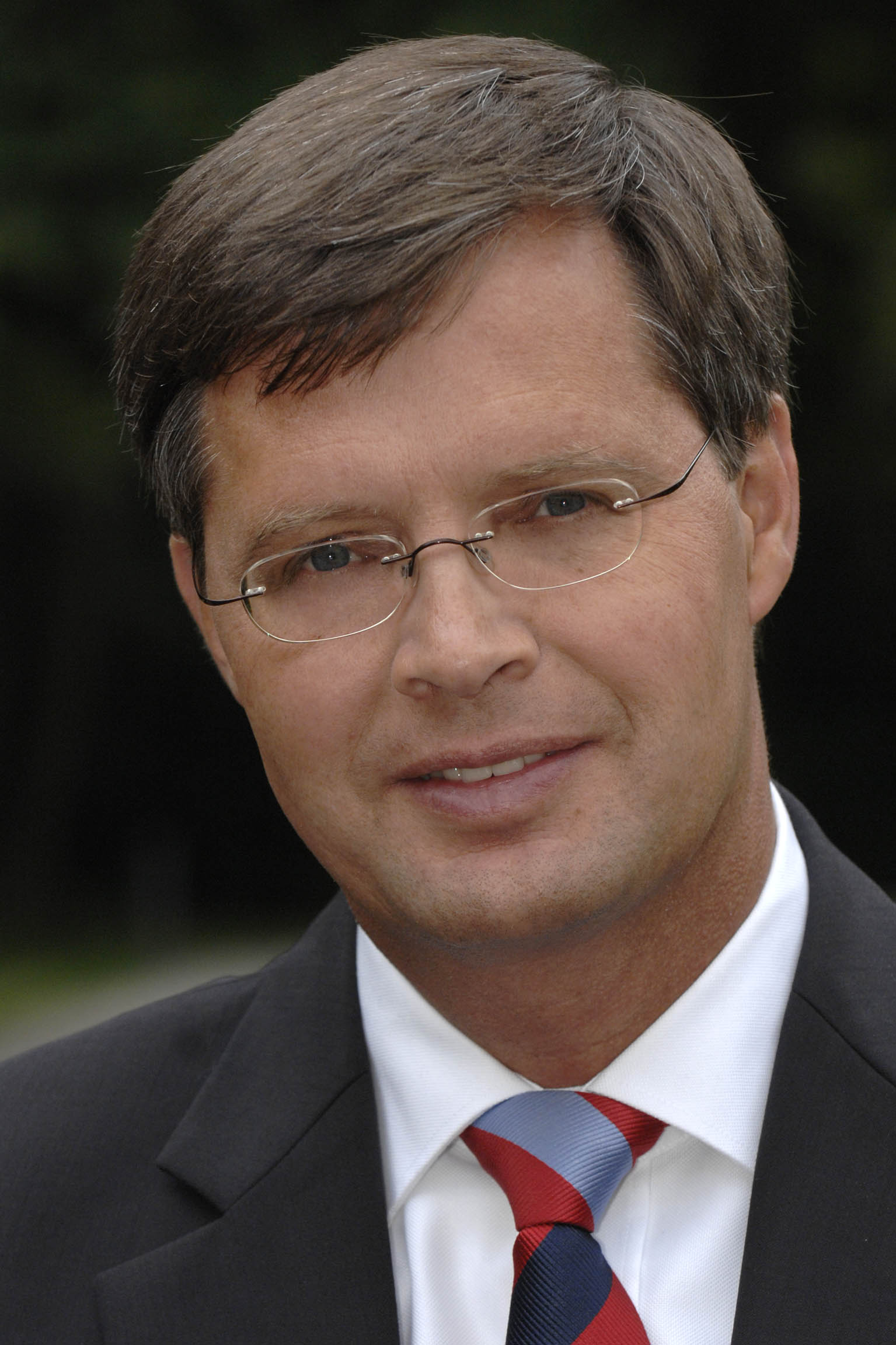
Jan Peter Balkenende, 2006

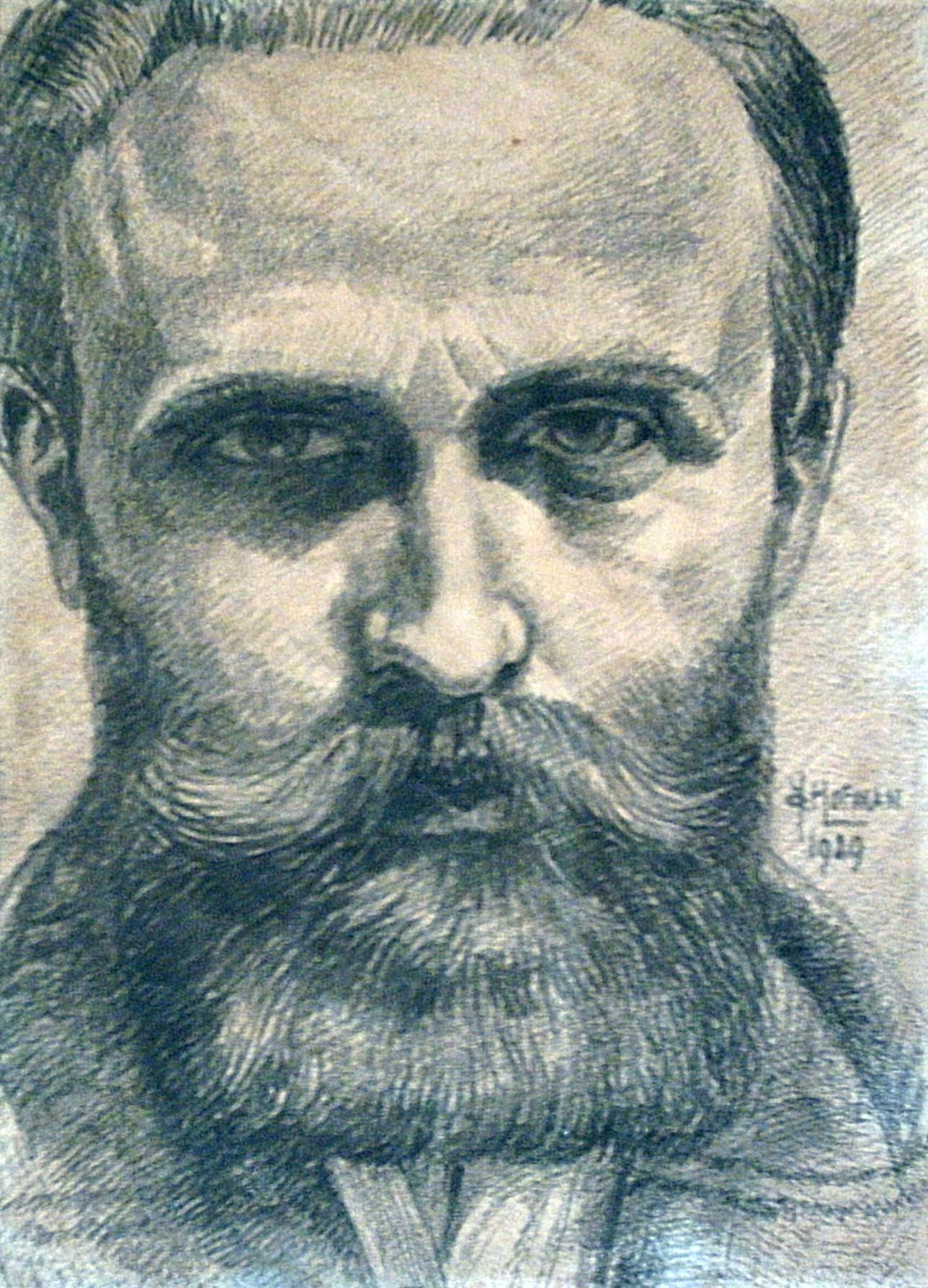
Jan Cornelis Hofman, self portrait, 1929

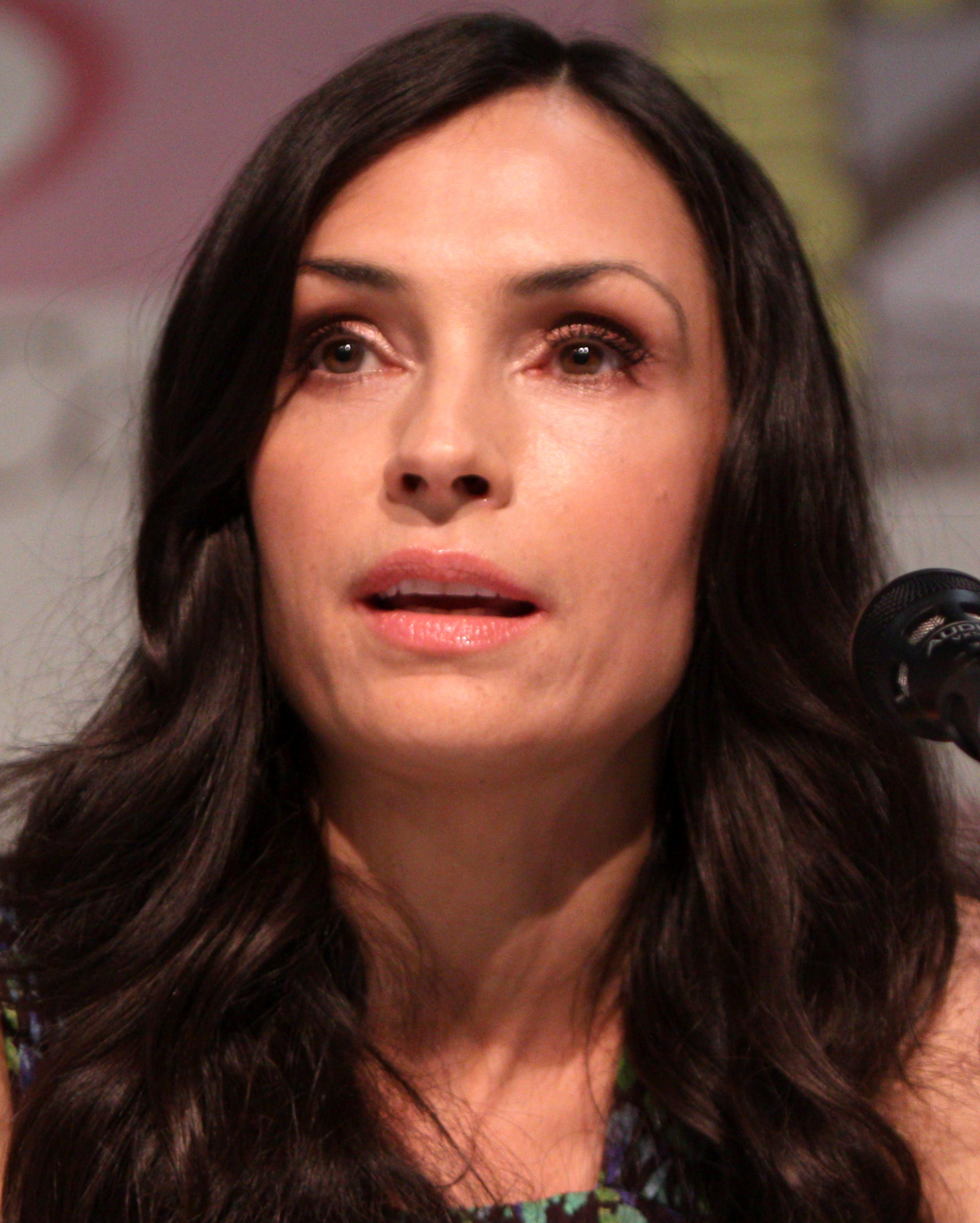
Famke Janssen, 2013

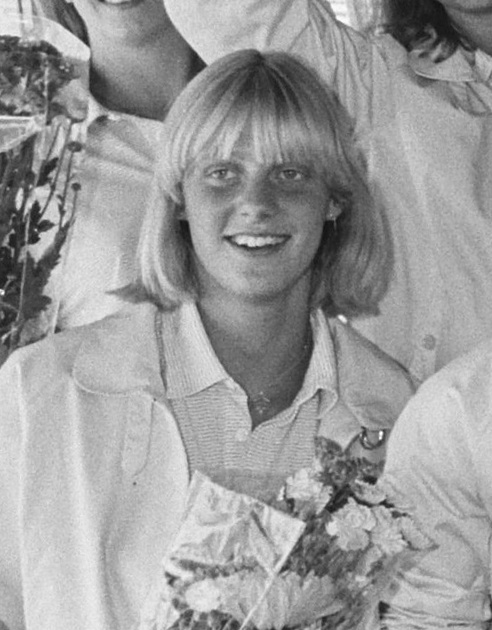
Jolanda de Rover, 1981

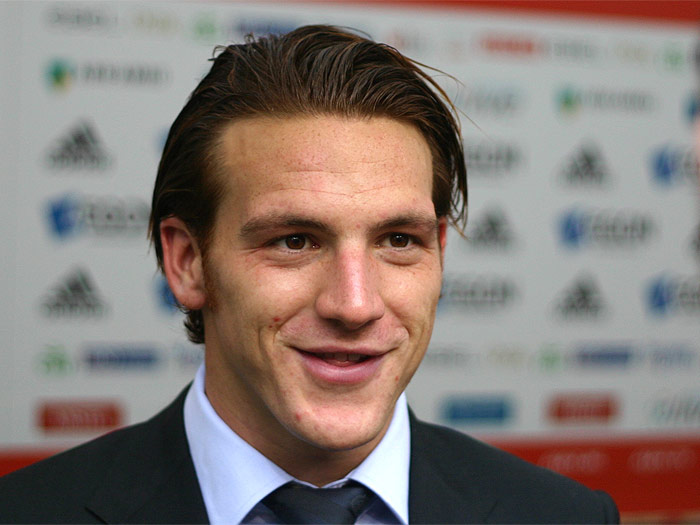
Robbert Schilder, 2008

=== Public thinking & public service ===
- Jan Arnoldus Schouten (1883–1971) a Dutch mathematician and academic
- Johanna Westerdijk (1883–1961) a Dutch plant pathologist and the first female Dutch professor
- Dick Bulterman (born 1951) professor of computer science at the Vrije Universiteit
- Klaas van Berkel (born 1953 in Nieuwer-Amstel) a Dutch historian of science and academic
- Arend Jan Boekestijn (born 1959) a Dutch former politician
- Jan Peter Balkenende (born 1956) a Dutch jurist and retired politician, a city councilman in Amstelveen and Prime Minister of the Netherlands from 2002 to 2010
- Jan van Zanen (born 1961) a Dutch politician, Mayor of Amstelveen from 2005 to 2013
- Jules Maaten (born 1961 in Nieuwer-Amstel) a Dutch former politician
- Okke Ornstein (born 1965) a Dutch investigative journalist, particularly of fraud and corruption

=== Arts ===
- Aagje Deken (1741 in Nieuwer-Amstel – 1804) a Dutch writer and novelist with Betje Wolff
- Jan Cornelis Hofman (born 1889 in Nieuwer-Amstel - 1966) a Dutch post-impressionist painter
- Hans van Manen (1932–2025) a Dutch ballet dancer, choreographer and photographer
- Theo Uittenbogaard (1946–2022) a Dutch radio & TV-producer
- Guido van Rijn (born 1950) a Dutch blues and gospel historian
- Leo de Boer (born 1953) a film director and lecturer at Utrecht School of the Arts
- Annemarie Roelofs (born 1955) a Dutch jazz trombone player and violinist
- Mathilde Santing (born 1958) a Dutch singer
- Antoinette Beumer (born 1962) a Dutch film director, older sister of actress Famke Janssen
- Joram Lürsen (born 1963) a Dutch film and TV director
- Famke Janssen (born ca.1964) an actress, director, screenwriter and former fashion model
- Petra Berger (born 1965) a Dutch classical crossover singer, composer, photographer and musical actress
- Marjolein Beumer (born 1966) a Dutch actress, younger sister of actress Famke Janssen
- Damien Moyal (born 1976) a Dutch-American singer
- Luca Gianquitto (born 1978) an Italian guitarist and music composer, lives in Amstelveen
- Michiel Huisman (born 1981) a Dutch actor, musician and singer-songwriter
- Tessa Schram (born 1988) a Dutch actress and director
- Martin Garrix (born 1996) a DJ and record producer
- Mesto (born 1999 as Melle Stomp) an electronic musician, record producer, remixer and DJ

=== Sport ===
- Han Dade (1878 n Nieuwer-Amstel – 1940) one of the three founders of AFC Ajax
- Piet Ikelaar (1896 in Nieuwer Amstel - 1992) a track cyclist and bronze medallist at the 1920 Summer Olympics
- Ellen van Maris (born 1957) a former professional female bodybuilder
- Jolanda de Rover (born 1963) a female former backstroke swimmer, competed at the 1980, 1984 and 1988 Summer Olympics and won a gold and a bronze medal in backstroke in 1984
- John Bosman (born 1965 in Bovenkerk) a Dutch retired footballer with 522 club caps
- Nicole Muns-Jagerman (born 1967) a tennis player, competed at the 1992 Summer Olympics
- Alexandra Verbeek (born 1973) a sailor, competed at the 1996 Summer Olympics
- Michael Reiziger (born 1973) a Dutch former professional footballer with 356 club caps
- Timme Hoyng (born 1976) a field hockey player competed at the 2008 Summer Olympics
- Lisanne de Roever (born 1979) a Dutch field hockey goalkeeper, team medallist at the 2004 and 2008 Summer Olympics
- Marlies Smulders (born 1982) a rower, team medallist at the 2004 Summer Olympics
- Rhian Ket (born 1983) a speed skater, won Dutch national title in the 1500 metres in 2009
- Robbert Schilder (born 1986) a footballer with over 350 club caps
- Kitty van Male (born 1988) a Dutch field hockey player, team gold medallist at the 2012 Summer Olympics
- Samantha Barning (born 1989) a Dutch professional badminton player
- Kelly Jonker (born 1990) a Dutch field hockey player, team gold medallist at the 2012 Summer Olympics
- Roland Bergkamp (born 1991) a Dutch footballer with over 200 club caps
- Mats Valk (born 1996) a Dutch Rubik's Cube speedsolver

== International relations ==
=== Sister cities ===
Amstelveen is twinned with:

Óbuda-Békásmegyer, Hungary; Tempelhof-Schöneberg, Germany	Villa El Salvador, Peru; Woking, United Kingdom

== See also ==
- VRA Cricket Ground
- Wagener Stadium
- Amsterdamseweg
- Rietwijkeroord

== Gallery ==
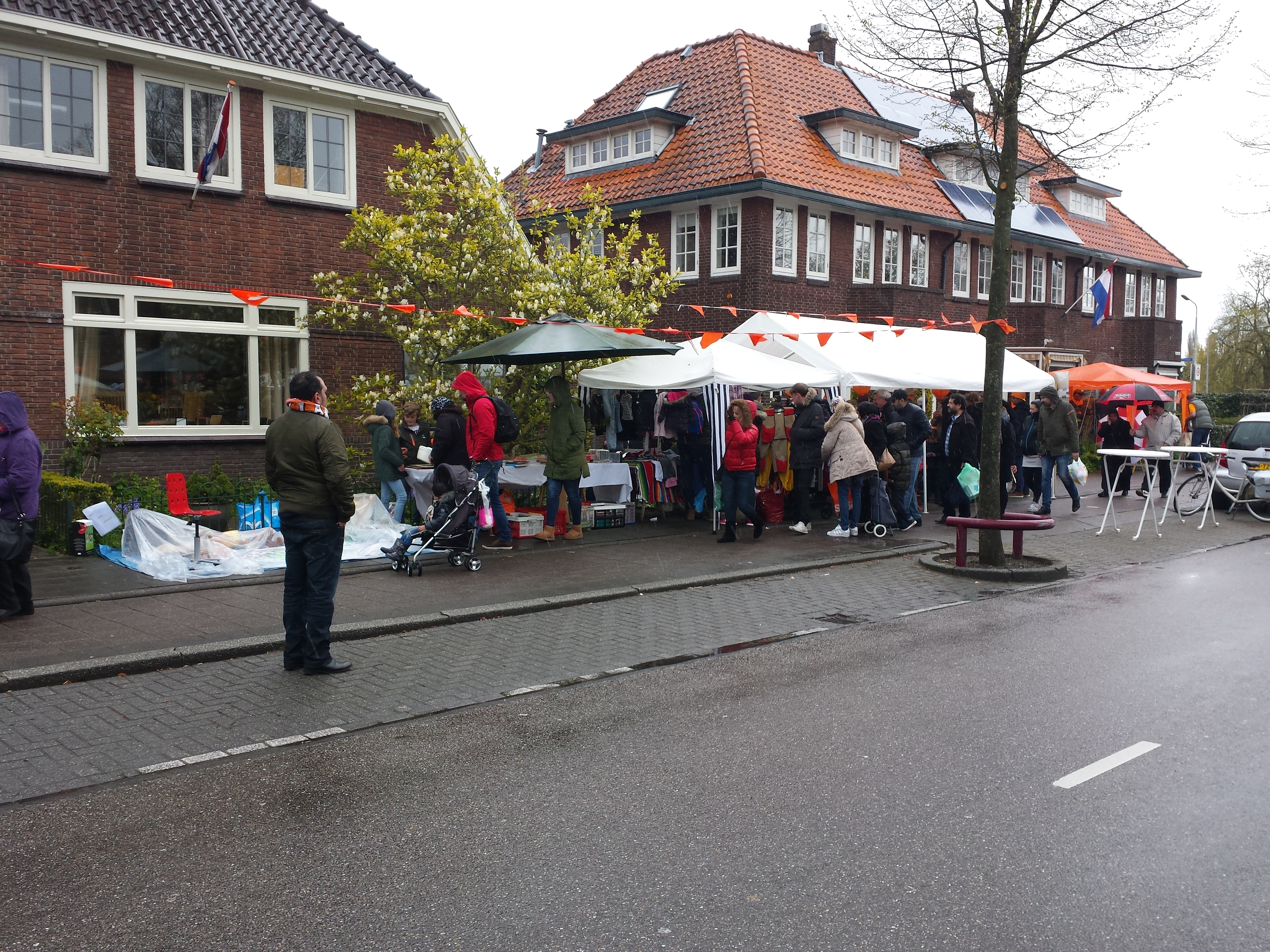
King's Day 2016

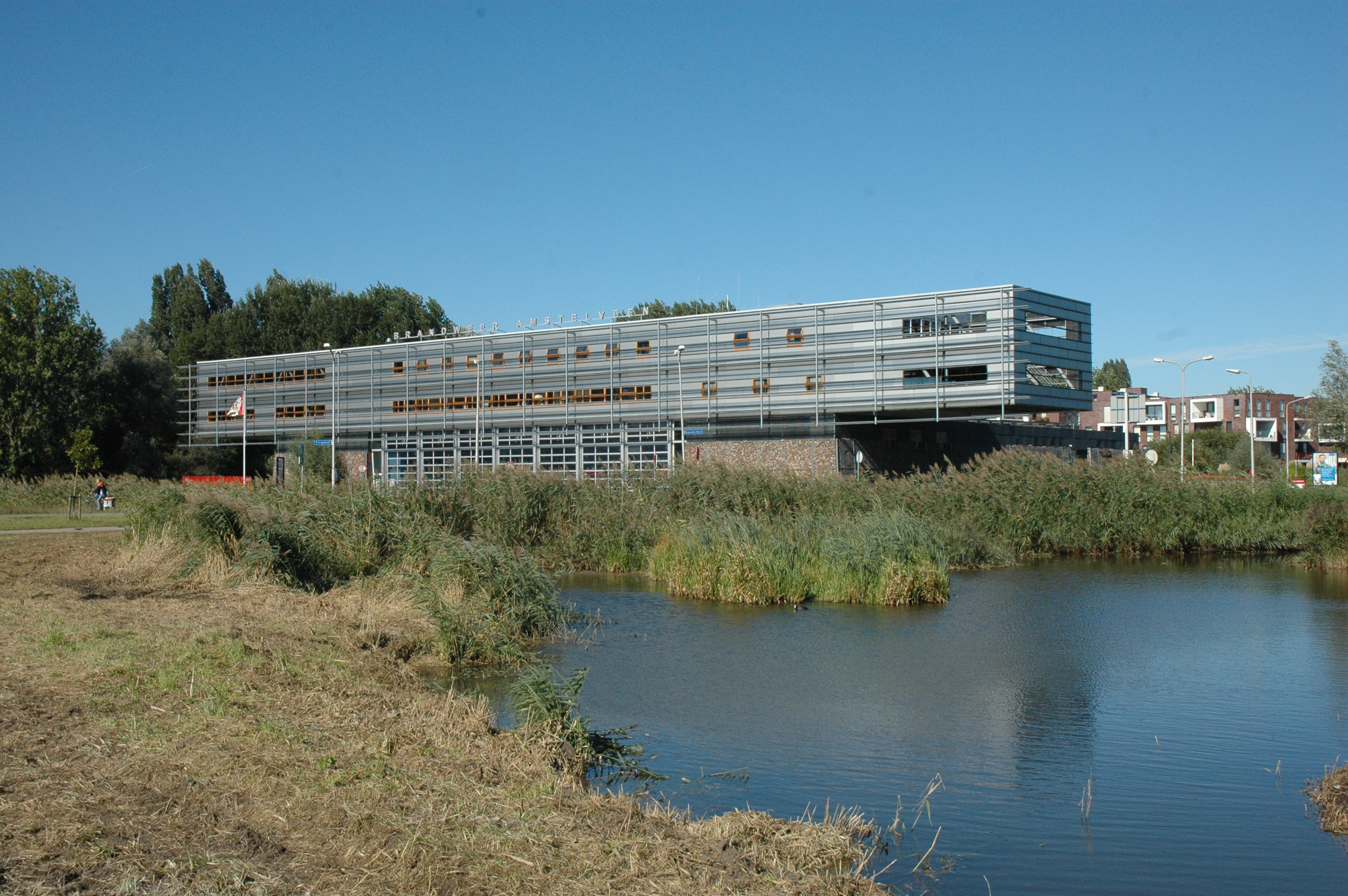
Fire Department building, Amstelveen

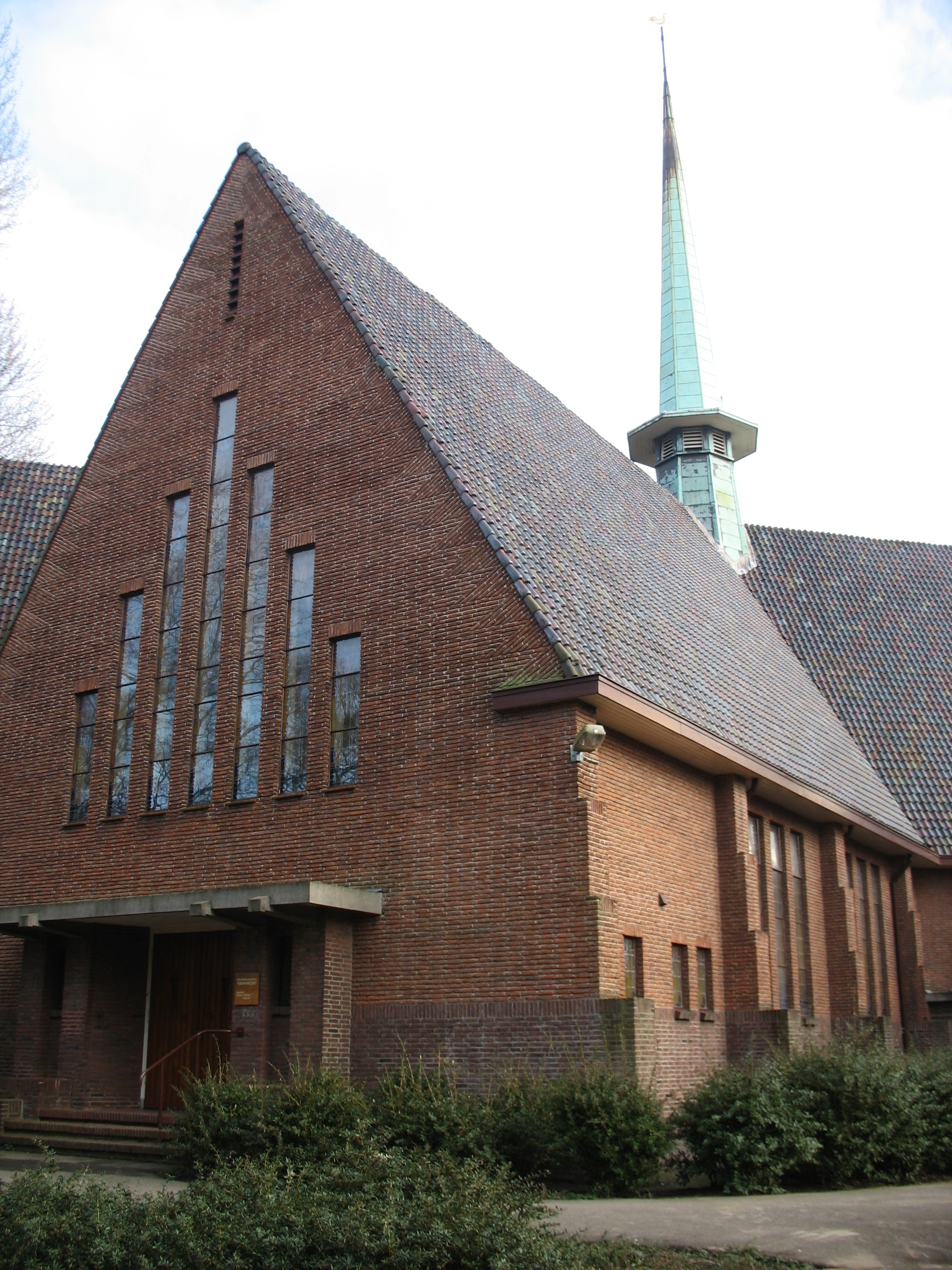
Paulus Church

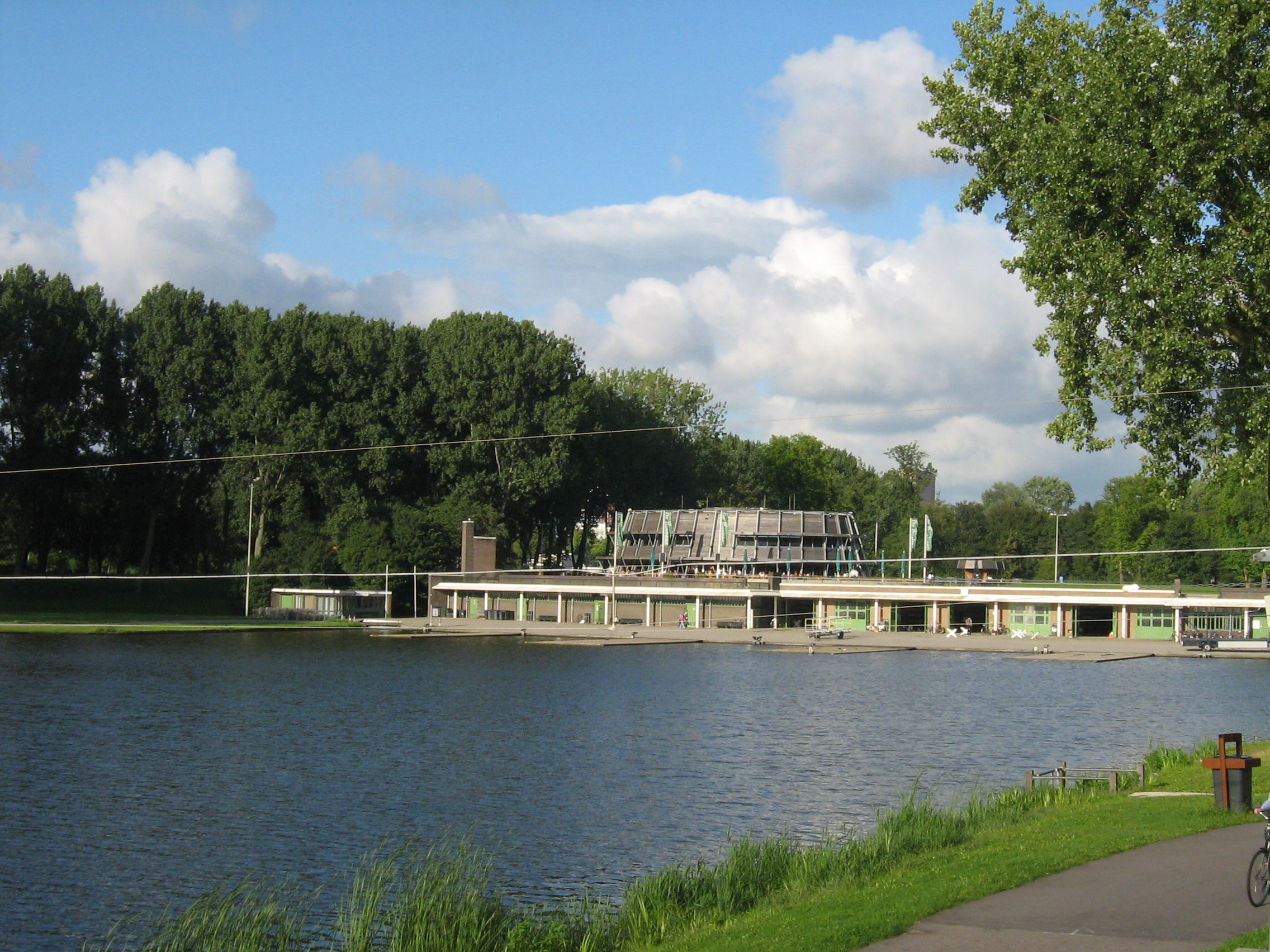
Boathouse Bosbaan
