= Jan Cornelis Hofman =

Dutch Post-Impressionist painter (1889–1966)

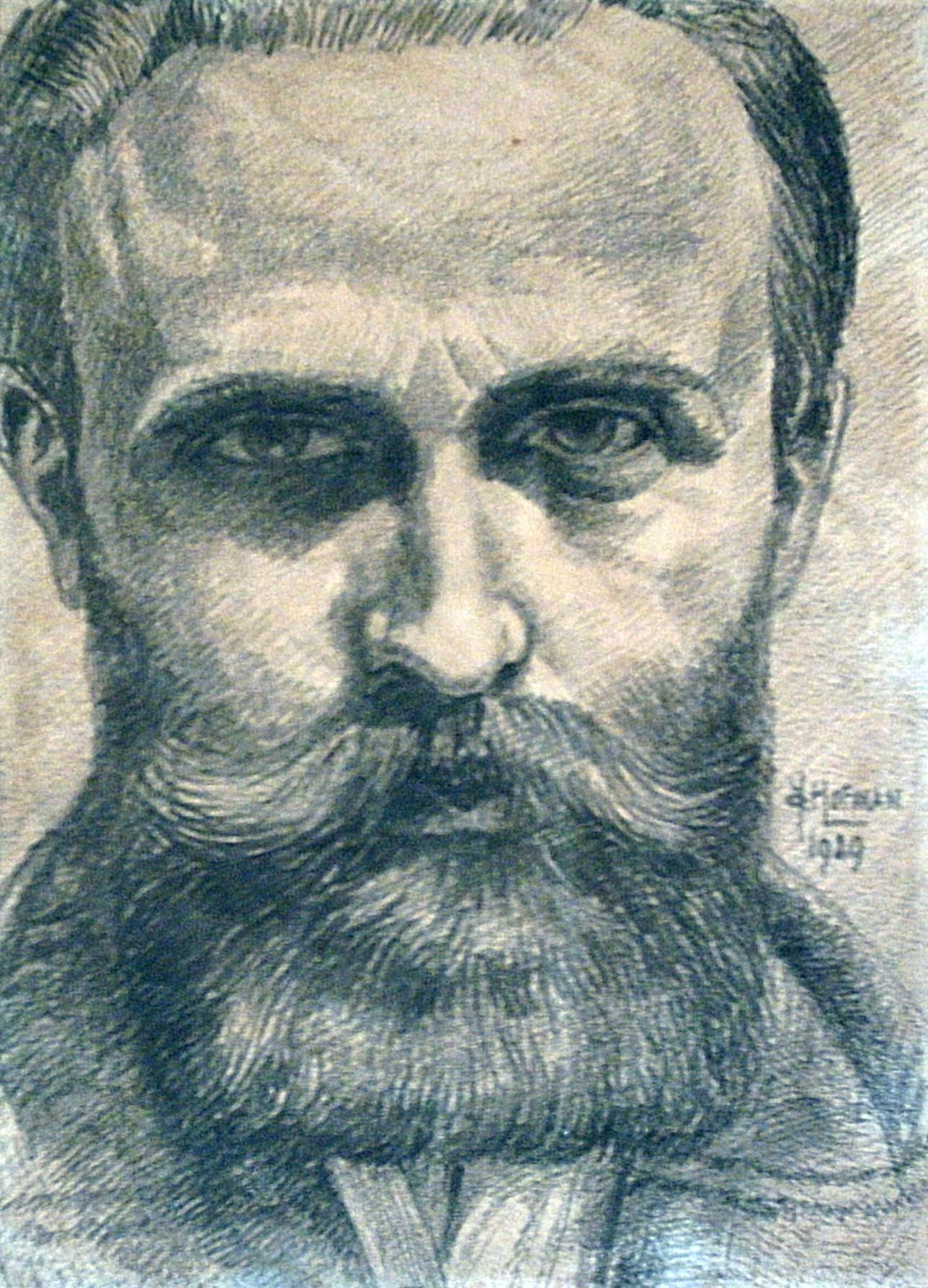
- Self-portrait, 1929
- Born: April 12, 1889; Nieuwer-Amstel, Netherlands
- Died: April 30, 1966 (aged 77); Schaerbeek, Brussels, Belgium
- Known for: Art painter
- Movement: Post-Impressionist

Jan Cornelis Hofman, alias Jean Hofman, was a Dutch post-impressionist painter, born on April 12, 1889, in Nieuwer-Amstel (Netherlands) and died on April 30, 1966, in Schaerbeek, Brussels (Belgium). He began as a decorator and porcelain painter in Delft (Netherlands).

His post-impressionist artistic preferences led him to paint Flemish landscapes, seascapes, farmhouse interiors, still lifes and flowers, but very few portraits. Living in Brussels as from 1913, he was member of the free workshop L'Effort and is mainly considered a Belgian artist.

== Biography ==
Hofman was born on April 12, 1889, in Nieuwer-Amstel (Netherlands). At the age of ten, he was placed in an orphanage in Dieren (Arnhem), after the death of his father. He began by reproducing decorative motifs and spent his free time roaming the area to better understand landscapes. He then worked for some time as an apprentice to a house painter, then became a porcelain painter, first in Delft, then in Makkum, a small town in Friesland.

In 1909, he lived in Brussels and then in Cologne. He worked mainly in the Netherlands until 1913. Conscripted in the spring of 1913 but a fierce conscientious objector, he left the Netherlands definitively and settled in Brussels with his sister Anna Alida, who had married Frans Buning, a childhood friend of the artist whom he had known since the orphanage. At the end of World War I, in 1918, he married Maria Marteau and gave his name to their first son, Jean Léon, born on August 15, 1911. Maria gave birth to their second son, Victor, on October 3, 1920.

He moved to Saint-Josse-ten-Noode (Brussels) in 1931. In the 1930s, he became a regular member of a group of artists and their free workshop L'Effort. He then spent almost two years, from 1936 to 1937, on the Belgian coast (De Haan, Ostend and Koksijde) and devoted himself particularly to his penchant for marine art. Meanwhile, his long walks in the surrounding countryside provided the pretext for a large number of canvas subjects captured either in the form of sketches or as small landscapes in 20x30 format (later taken up again until the end of the war and expanded on larger canvases).

He moved permanently in 1937 to the Avenue Dailly/Daillylaan in Schaerbeek (Brussels), but kept his workshop on the Rue Sainte-Gudule/Sint-Gudulastraat (opposite the Cathedral of St. Michael and St. Gudula) until 1945, the year of the street's demolition because of work on the North–South connection. During World War II, his entire family hid from the Germans in the workshop to escape from enforced works. Then, until his death, he worked exclusively in his apartment on the basis of sketches he made during various trips and excursions in Flanders and the Netherlands. He died on April 30, 1966, in Schaerbeek.

== Work ==
Painting was Hofman's ideal and guided him throughout his life. He produced more than 7,500 works, mostly oils on canvas and generally in 30×40 and 50×60 formats, made in his workshop, but also many oil works on light panels or cardboards (around 20x30), as he preferred those when drawing from life during his excursions. Above all a painter of landscapes, seascapes, river landscapes, farmhouse interiors, still lifes and flowers, he only produced around thirty portraits. Throughout his career, he remained faithful to his landscape theme, which gradually evolved towards greater lightness and gained in color and luminosity, always in a post-impressionist style.

His first artistic training was given at the orphanage in Dieren-Arnhem, where he is placed at the age of ten. In this institute, he received his first lessons, which consisted of copies of existing drawings, but more particularly of decorative motifs and wall frescoes, which were very fashionable at that time. In 1906, he accepted a job as a porcelain painter in Delft, then in Makkum. His work then consisted in decorating small square plates of "Delft porcelain", plates and other objects. In 1909, after leaving his employment, he began his life as a free and independent painter.

In 1928, he organized an exhibition of his works in Brussels (the first and only he would ever agree to do), and participated the same year, in Namur, in an overall exhibition organized in aid of flood victims. Photographs of several of his paintings illustrated the newspaper reviews of the time. In the 1930s, he assiduously frequented the group L'Effort, a corporation of artists whose workshop was located at the Grand-Place/Grote Markt in Brussels. Along with his artist friends, he benefited from the services of models and produced many drawings (charcoals, "sanguines") drawn from life.

After the war, he reached the peak of his art by playing with sets of lights and shadows throughout his landscape subjects of predilection: fields, undergrowths, farmyards, etc. He soon gained considerable notoriety and the interest of artistic circles, without however yielding to their demands and painting only as his desires dictated. To live and meet his family responsibilities, he was nevertheless obliged to sell paintings through art galleries (e.g., Ferbach), which increasingly pressed him in the face of growing demand from a clientele attracted by the conviviality of his works. Many of them were thus sold on the North American market. The paintings that he agreed to paint in this way, which he called "commercial", would however represent almost two-thirds of his work, often of a style in accordance with the image that the public had of it, and therefore may be less sought after in terms of artistic study. Such works were generally signed with a surname (e.g., Mentens) that he reserved separately for each art dealer. His deep repulsion to "sell himself" led him to refuse any form of exhibition or publicity, except those organized by the dealers themselves, in which he always refused to participate personally. This explains the confidential nature of the sale of his works after his death.

== Gallery ==
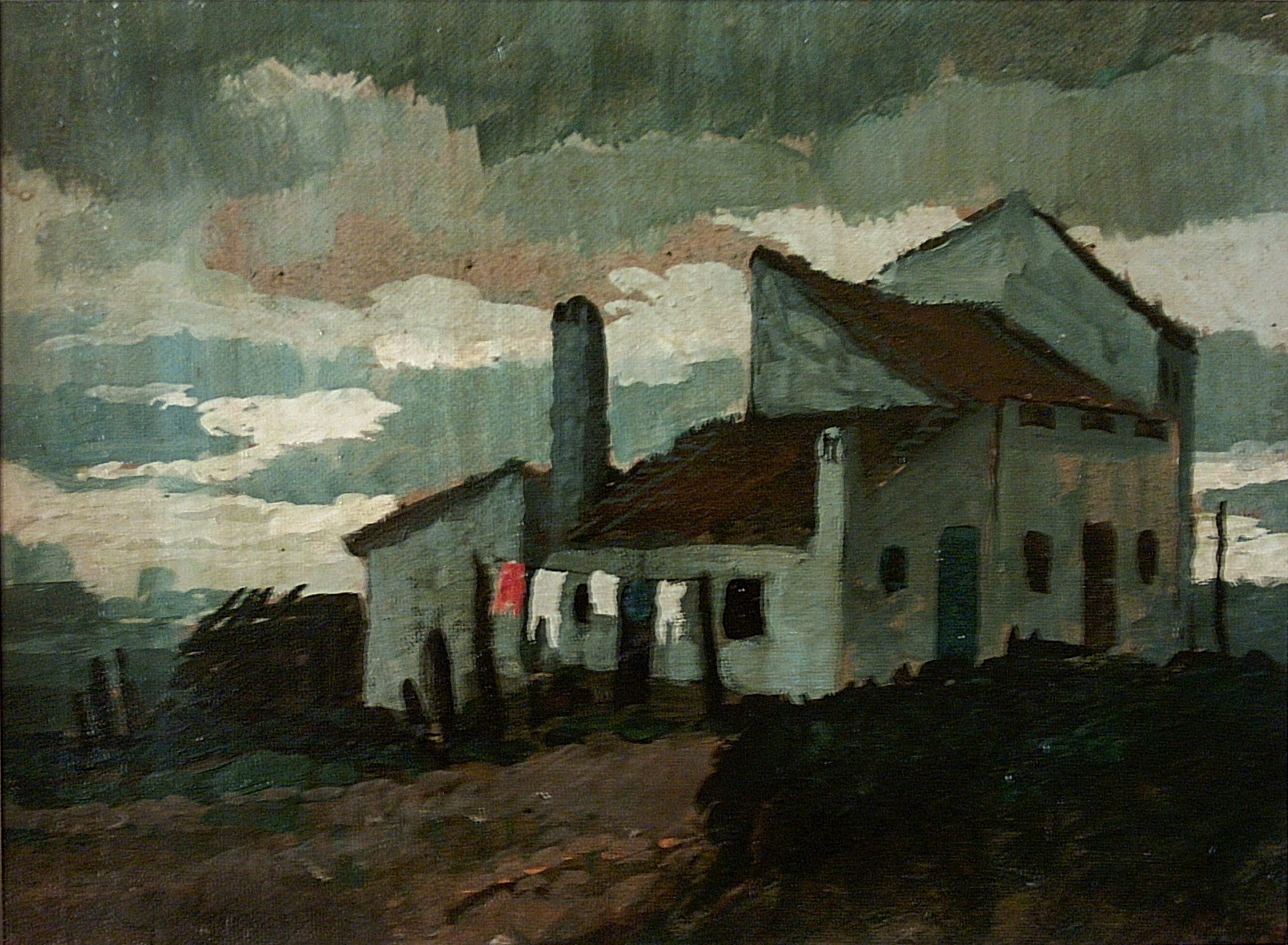
Grey Weather, oil on canvas, 1920-1925

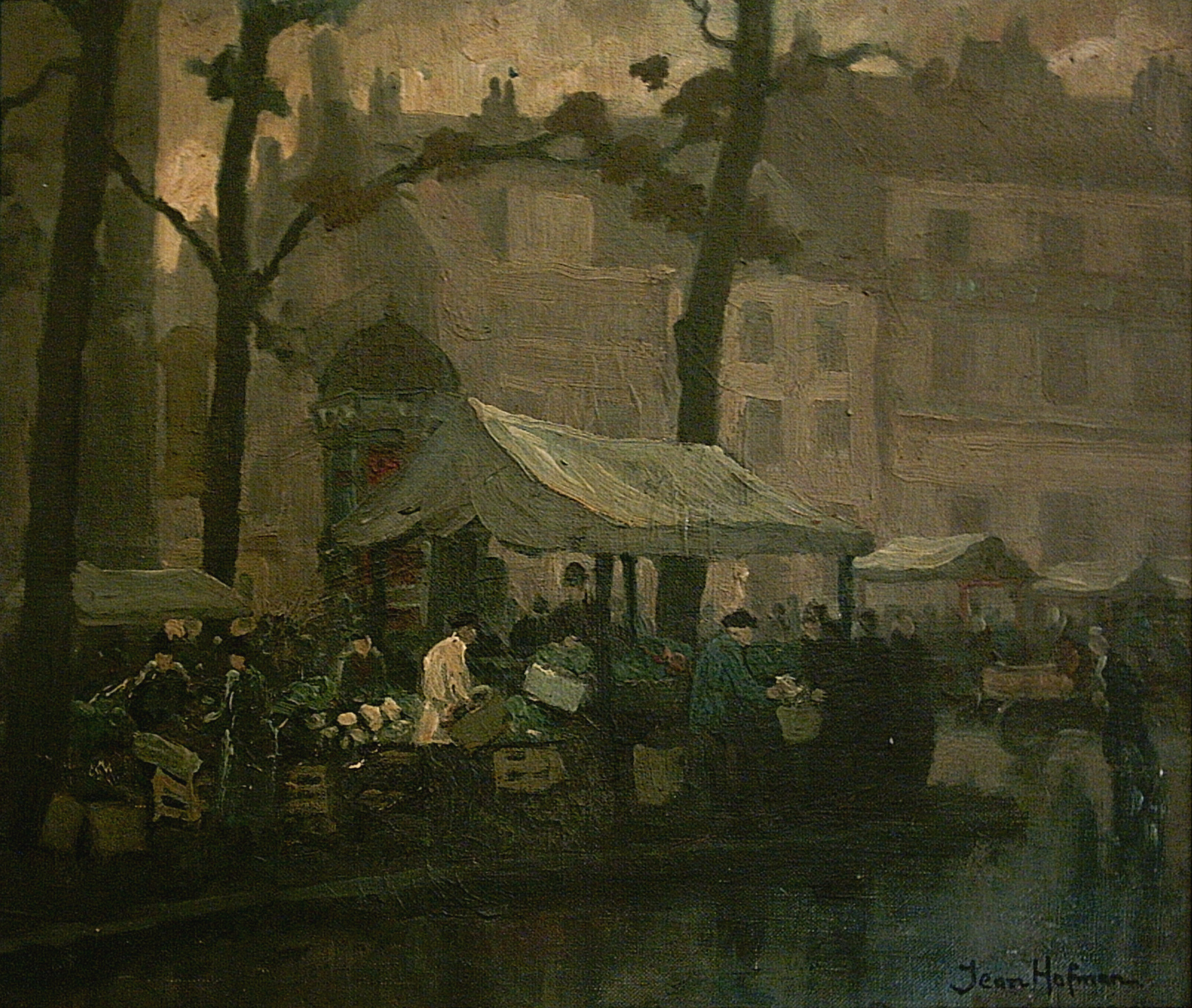
St. Catherine's Market, oil on canvas, 1925-1930

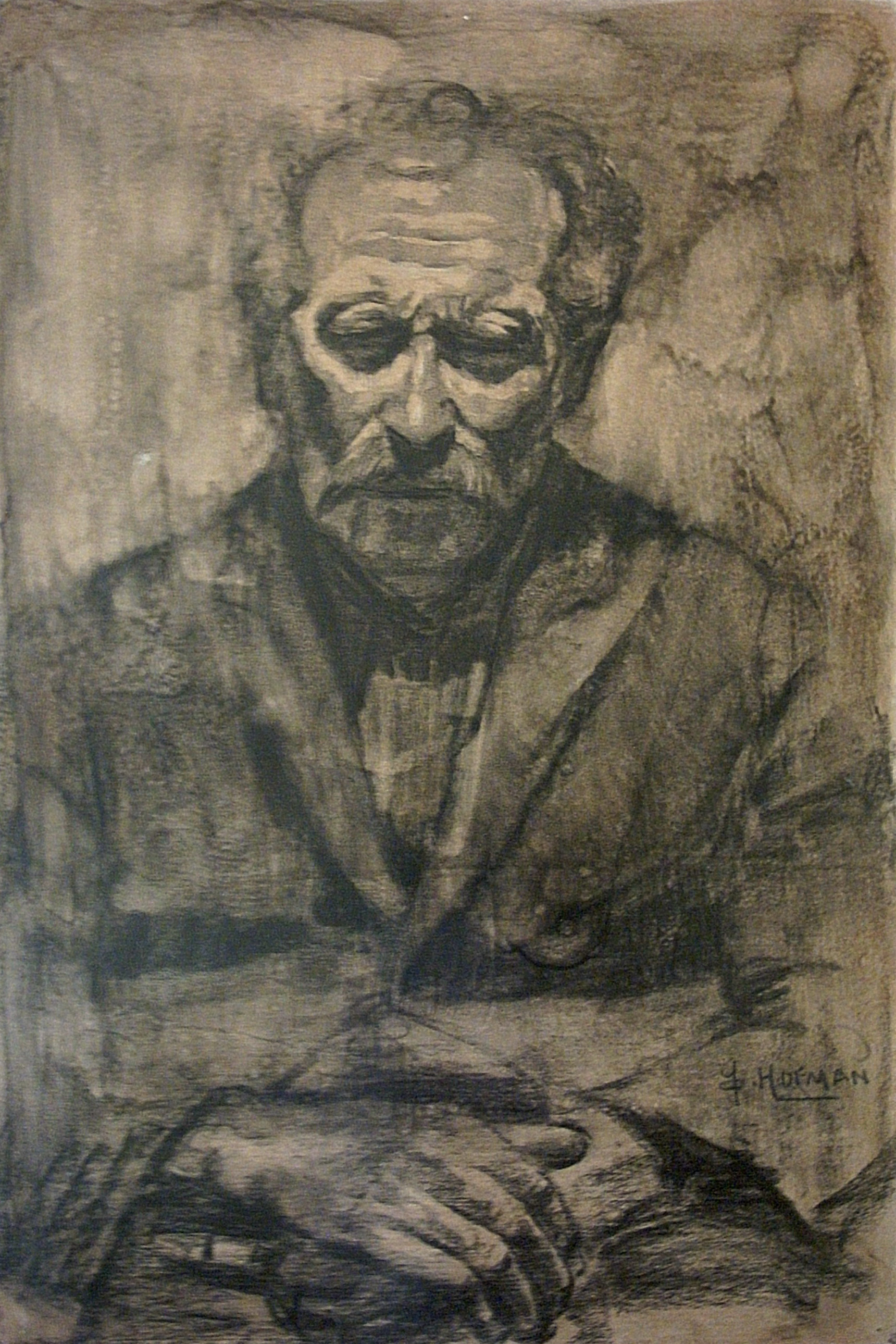
Old Man, charcoal on paper, 1928-1932

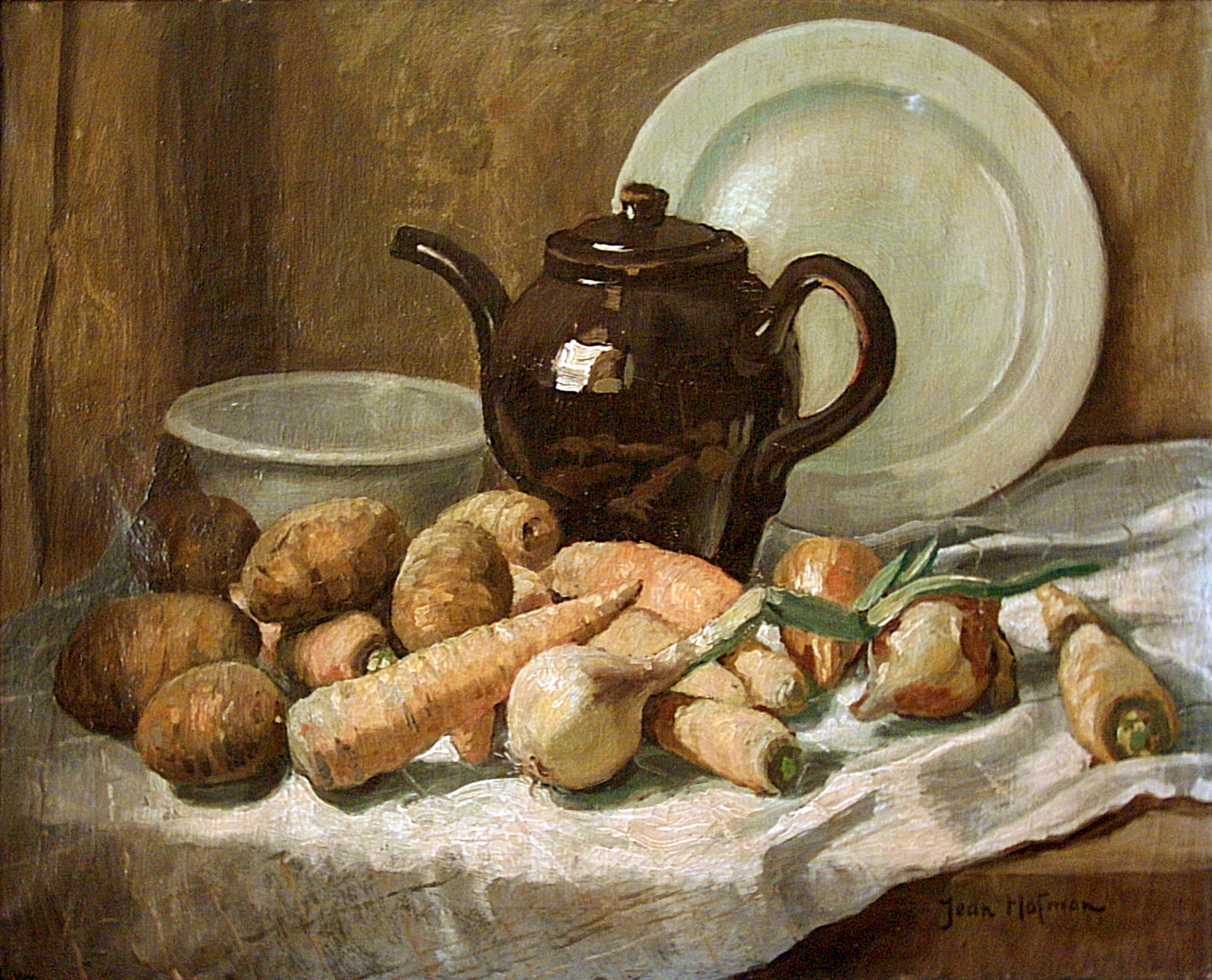
Brown Teapot and 'Pot au Feu', oil on canvas, 1935

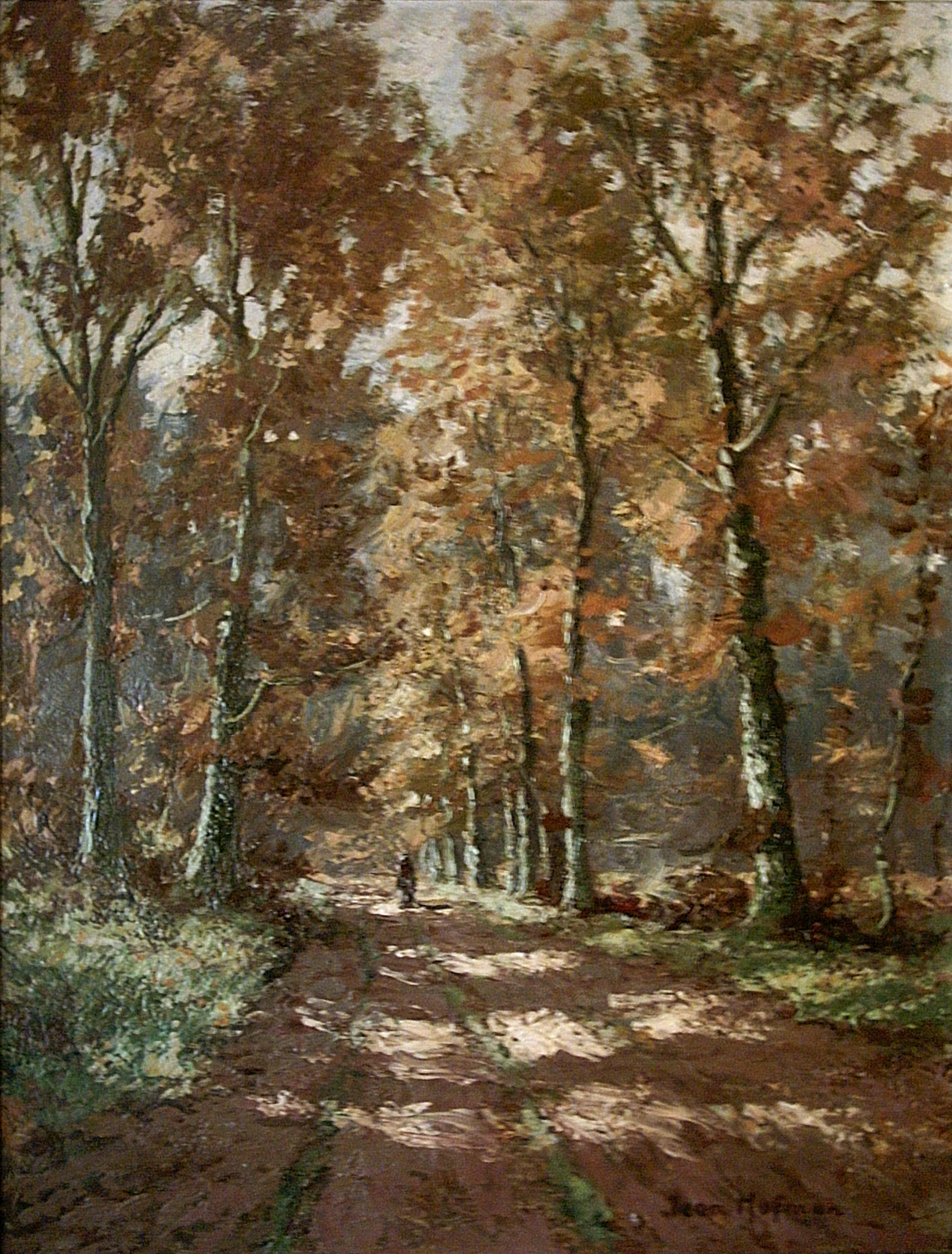
Undergrowth in Autumn, oil on panel, 1952

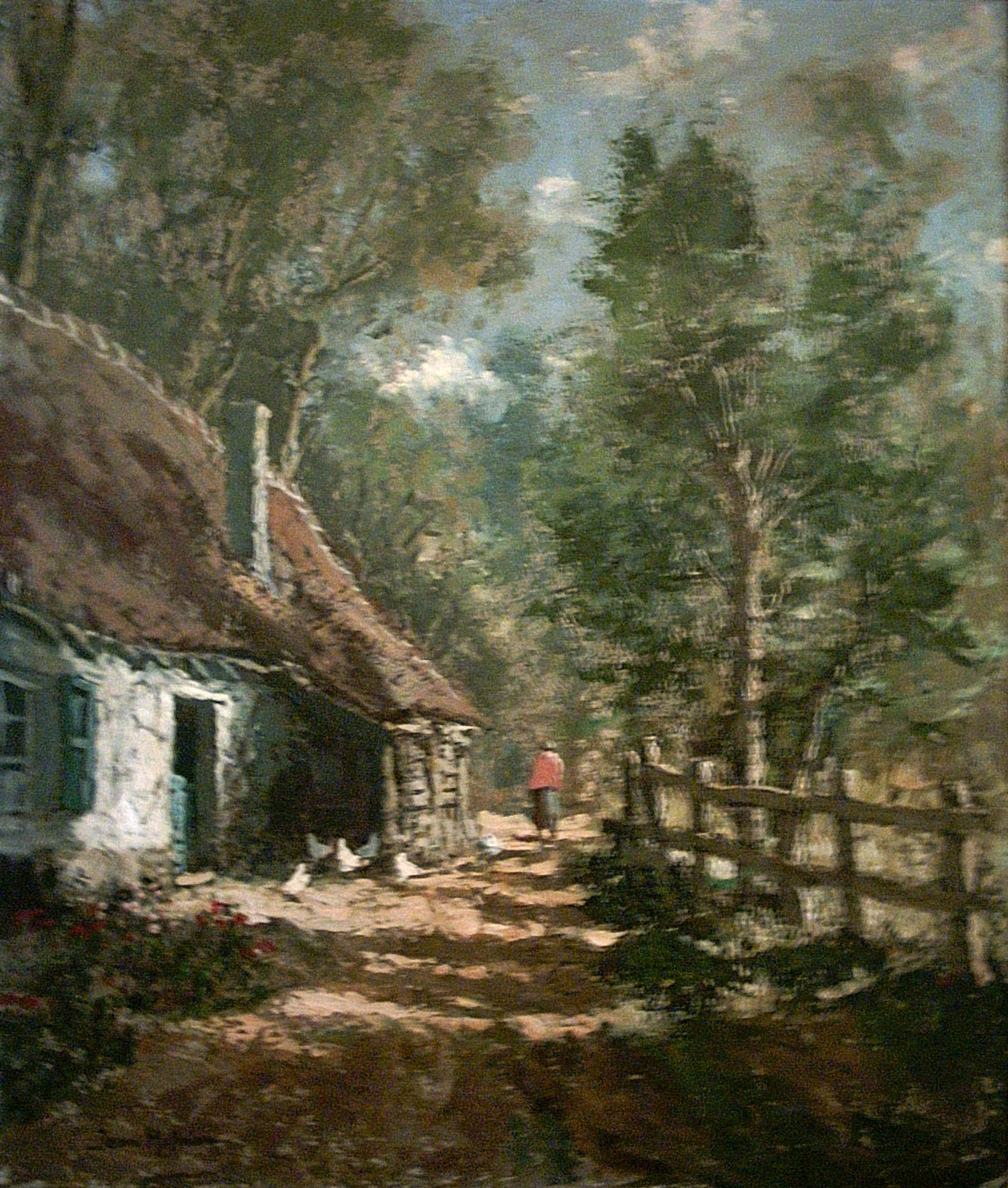
Old Farm in Brabant, oil on panel, 1957

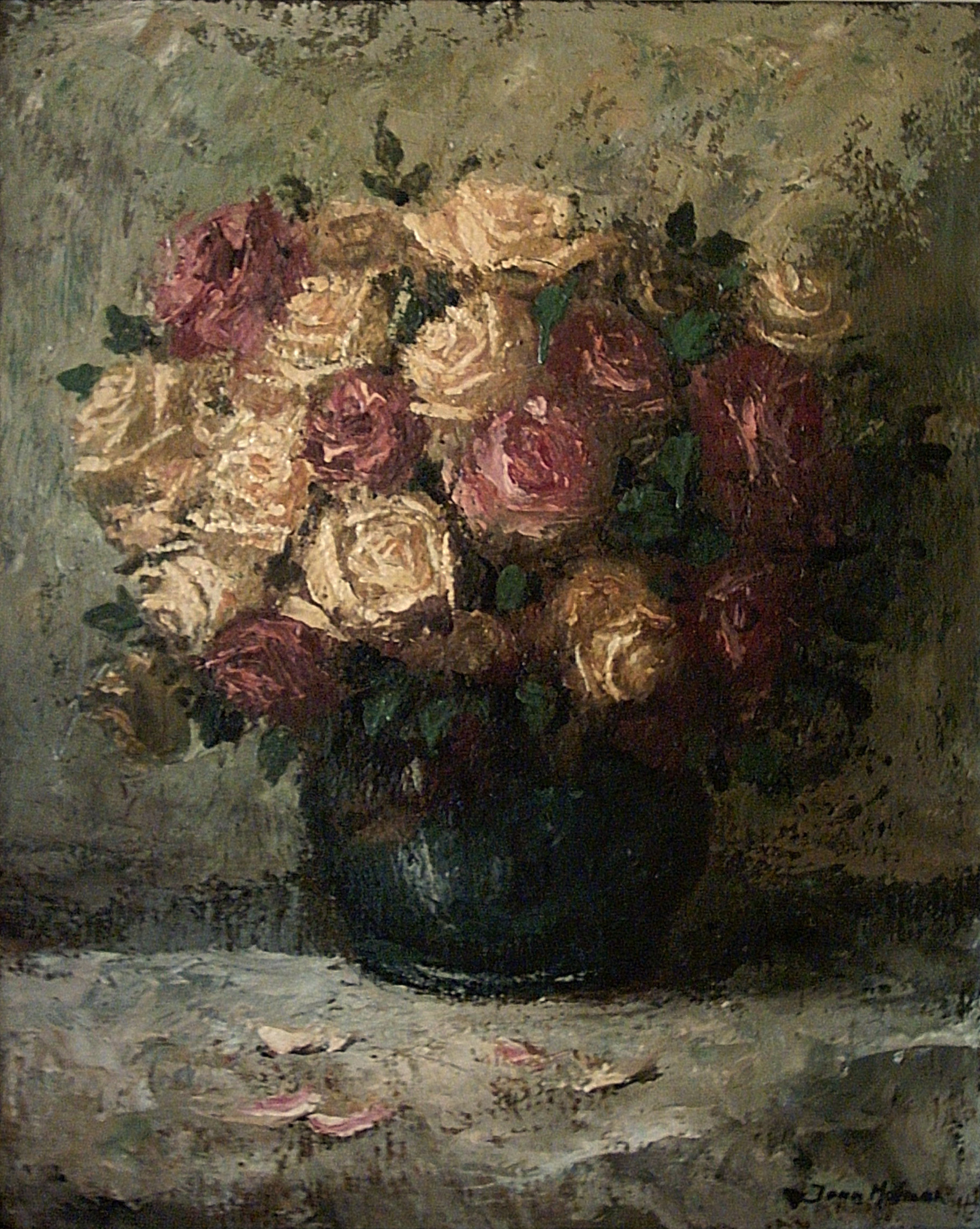
Roses in Blue Pot, oil on canvas, 1960

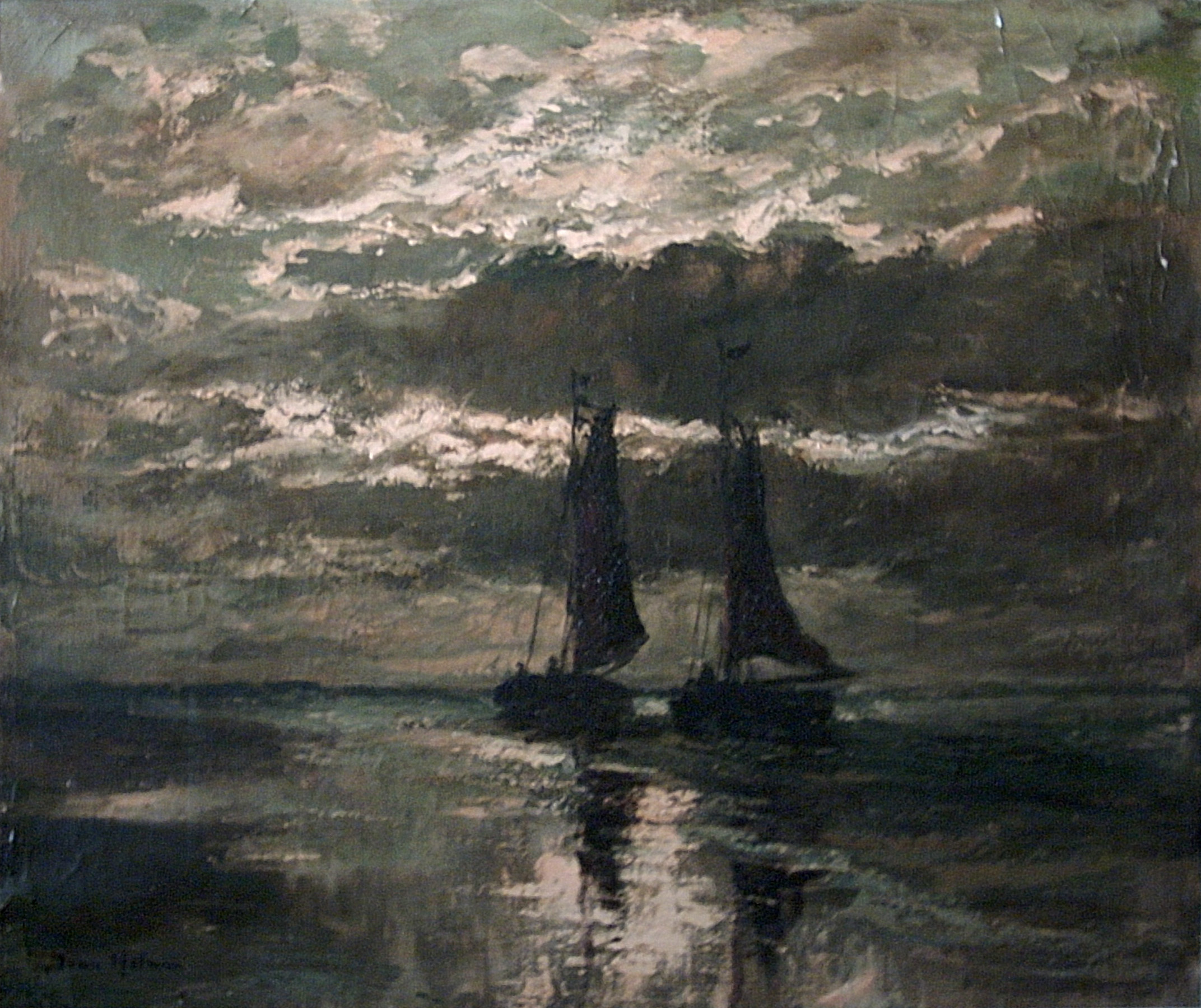
Evening seascape, oil on canvas, 1965
