= Tjapko Poppens =

Dutch politician

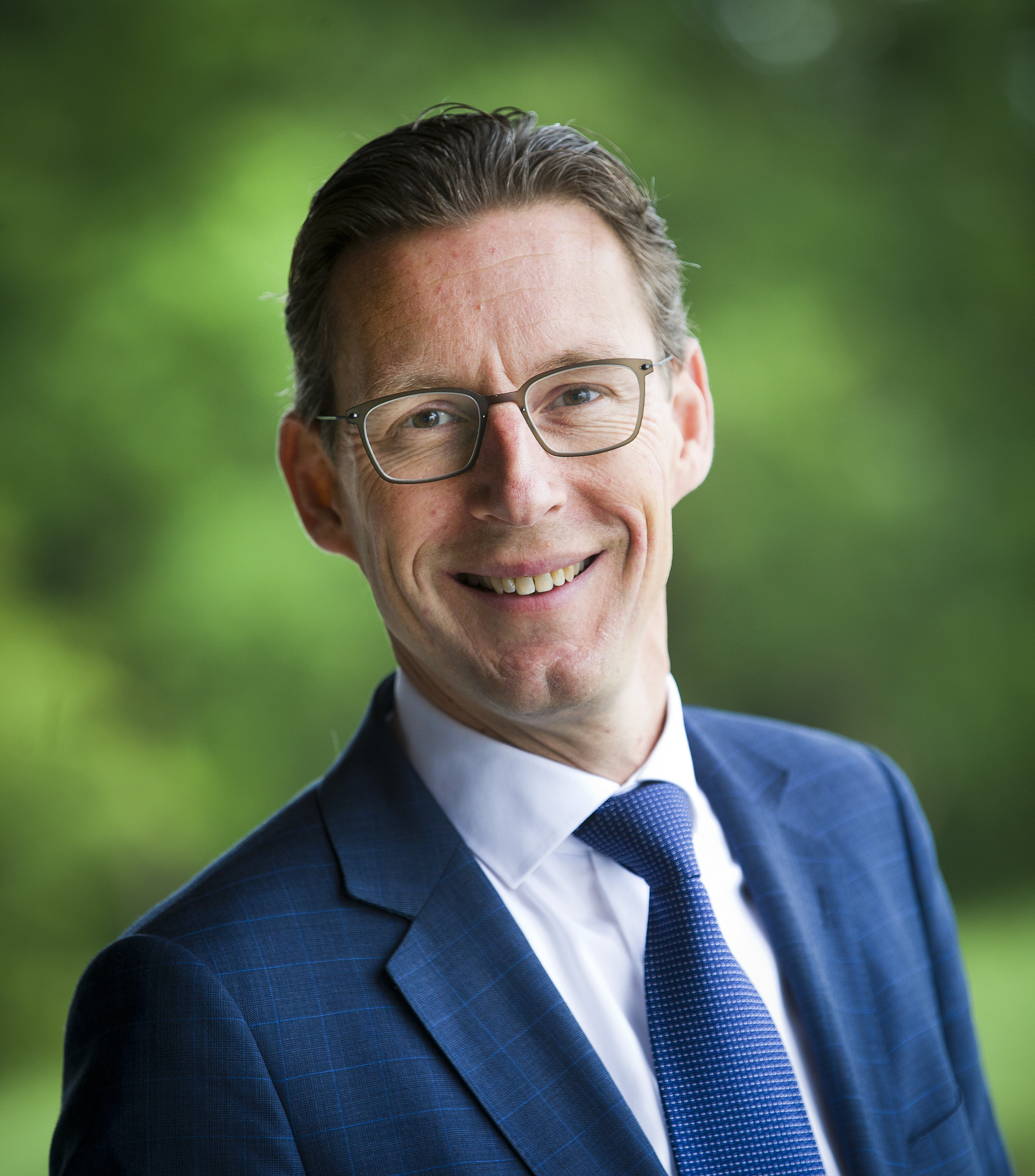
Poppens in 2019

T.R. "Tjapko" Poppens (born 31 July 1970) is a Dutch politician serving as mayor of Amstelveen since 2019. A member of the People's Party for Freedom and Democracy (VVD), he previously served as mayor of Wijk bij Duurstede from 2012 until 2019.

== Career ==
Poppens was born and grew up in the province of Groningen. He graduated in Economics of Agriculture and Environment at Wageningen University with a major in business and administration. He worked at KLM and became subsequently a corporate staff director of the municipality of Enschede.

From 2005 until 2012 he was a VVD councillor in Deventer, leading the VVD group since 2007.

In 2015 he also became chairman of the Dutch brewers, as successor of Hans Wiegel.

Tjapko Poppens is married and father of three children.
