= Jan de Bakker =

- Jan de Bakker
- Born: 1499
- Died: 15 September 1525 (aged 25–26)
- Other names: Johannes Pistorius Woerdensis
- Education: Old University of Leuven

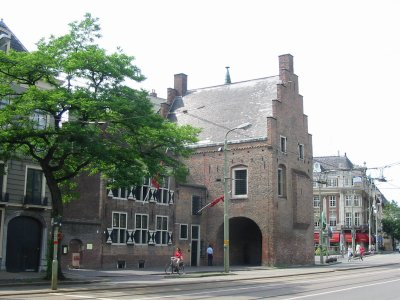
Gevangenpoort in The Hague where Jan de Bakker was incarcerated prior to his execution in 1525

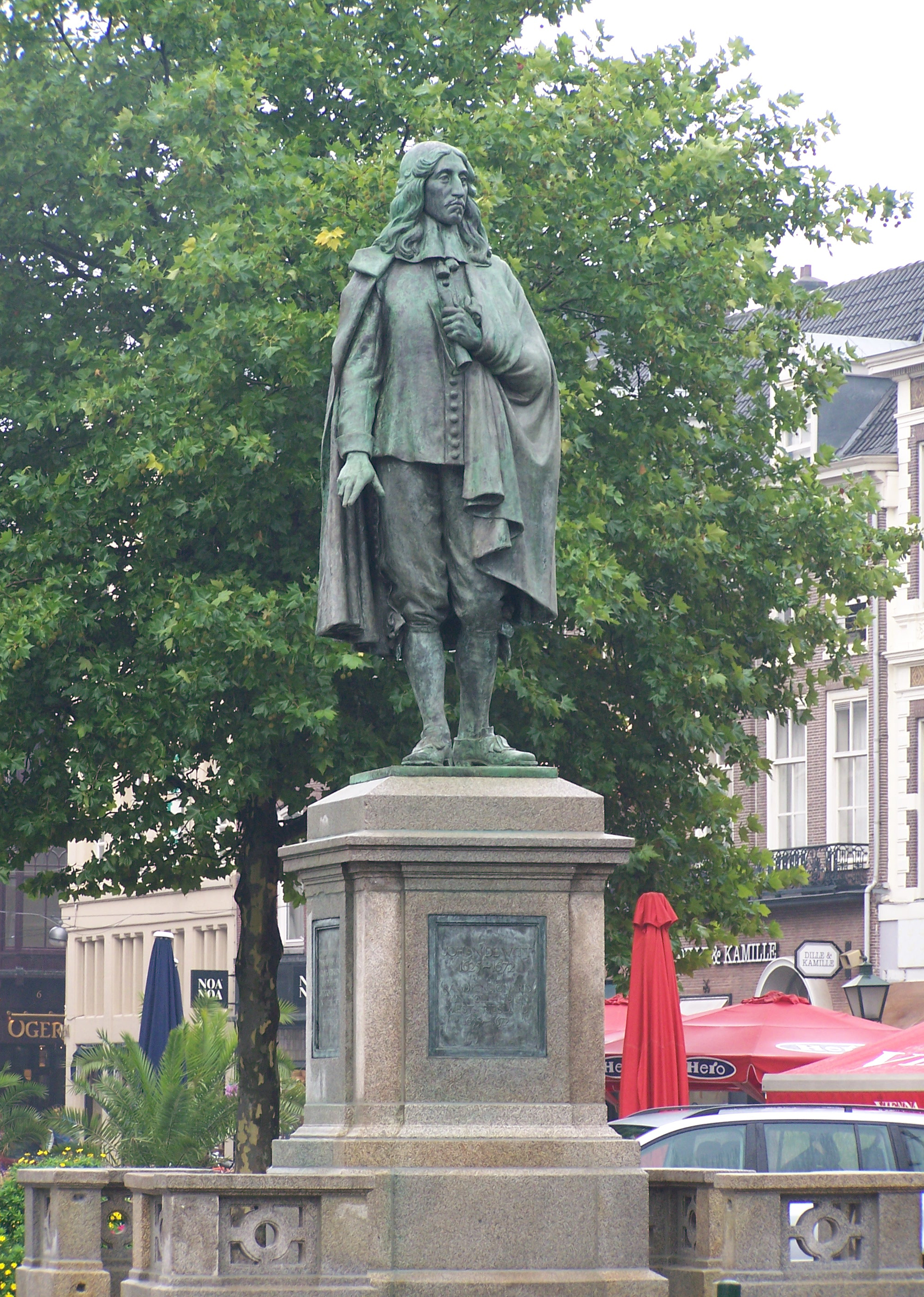
Statue of Johan de Witt at De Plaats in The Hague. His two fingers point at the place where he was lynched in 1672. This is also the place where Jan de Bakker was executed in 1525.

Jan Jansz de Bakker van Woerden (Latin name: Johannes Pistorius Woerdensis; 1499 – 15 September 1525) was a Roman Catholic priest who was the first priest in the Northern Netherlands to be put to death as a direct result of his beliefs.

== Biography ==
Jan de Bakker's father was a sexton in Woerden and also tenant of the brickworks, and his surname may have been derived from that profession. Bakker was a pupil of Johannes Rhodius (Hinne Rode), headmaster of St. Jerome School of the Brethren of the Common Life in Utrecht, who was a proponent of Sacramentarianism. The Dutch Sacramentarians rejected the sacraments of the Catholic Church and denied that the host consecrated at Mass was the real body and blood of Jesus Christ. They called indulgences and pilgrimages mere idolatry and were critical of the low moral standards and conduct of the clergy. In 1520 De Bakker's father called him back to Woerden, concerned that some of his views were contrary to the Church's doctrine and could get him in trouble with the authorities. De Bakker transferred to the Old University of Leuven and in 1522 completed his education there.

De Bakker returned to Woerden, was ordained in Utrecht as a priest, and assisted his father as sexton and deacon. De Bakker started to spread his views, some of which are considered heretical by the Church, and in May 1523 he and another priest were arrested by the steward of the castle. After a short while they were released, and it is thought that the two travelled to Wittenberg, but there is no evidence he met with Martin Luther. After he returned he continued his preaching and aggravated his conflict with the Roman Catholic Church by breaking his vow of celibacy and getting married.

In the night of May 9, 1525, De Bakker was arrested and the next day transferred to The Hague, where was tried by the Inquisition. Refusing to recant, he was defrocked and sentenced to death, and on September 15, 1525 burned at the stake in The Hague. His last words were a quotation of 1 Corinthians 15:55: "O death, where is thy victory? O death, where is thy sting?"

His widow saved her life by recanting views similar to her husband's and lived out her life in an abbey.

== See also ==
- Dirk Willems
- Patrick Hamilton
