= Kalsbeek =

Kalsbeek may refer to:

- Ella Kalsbeek (born 1955), Dutch politician
- Kalsbeek College, secondary school
