= Masters W55 1500 metres world record progression =

This is the progression of world record improvements of the 1500 metres W55 division of Masters athletics.

Key

Incomplete information Pending

Hand	Auto	Athlete	Nationality	Birthdate	Location	Date
	4:41.46	Anne Gilshinan	Ireland	6 April 1964	Belfast Ireland	22 June 2019
	4:48.65	Clare Elms	United Kingdom	26 December 1963	Tonbridge	22 April 2019
	4:51.26	Silke Schmidt	Germany	7 August 1959	Rotterdam Netherlands	16 July 2015
	4:54.19	Silke Schmidt	Germany	7 August 1959	Woerden Netherlands	27 September 2014
4:57.4		Carolyn Jane Oxton	United Kingdom	21 August 1943	Bedford	30 August 1998
	5:03.33	Edeltraud Pohl	Germany	14 July 1936	Trier	17 August 1991
5:15.7		Jean Albury	Australia	28 September 1929	Melbourne	1 April 1985
