= Woerden train disaster =

Train accident near Woerden, the Netherlands

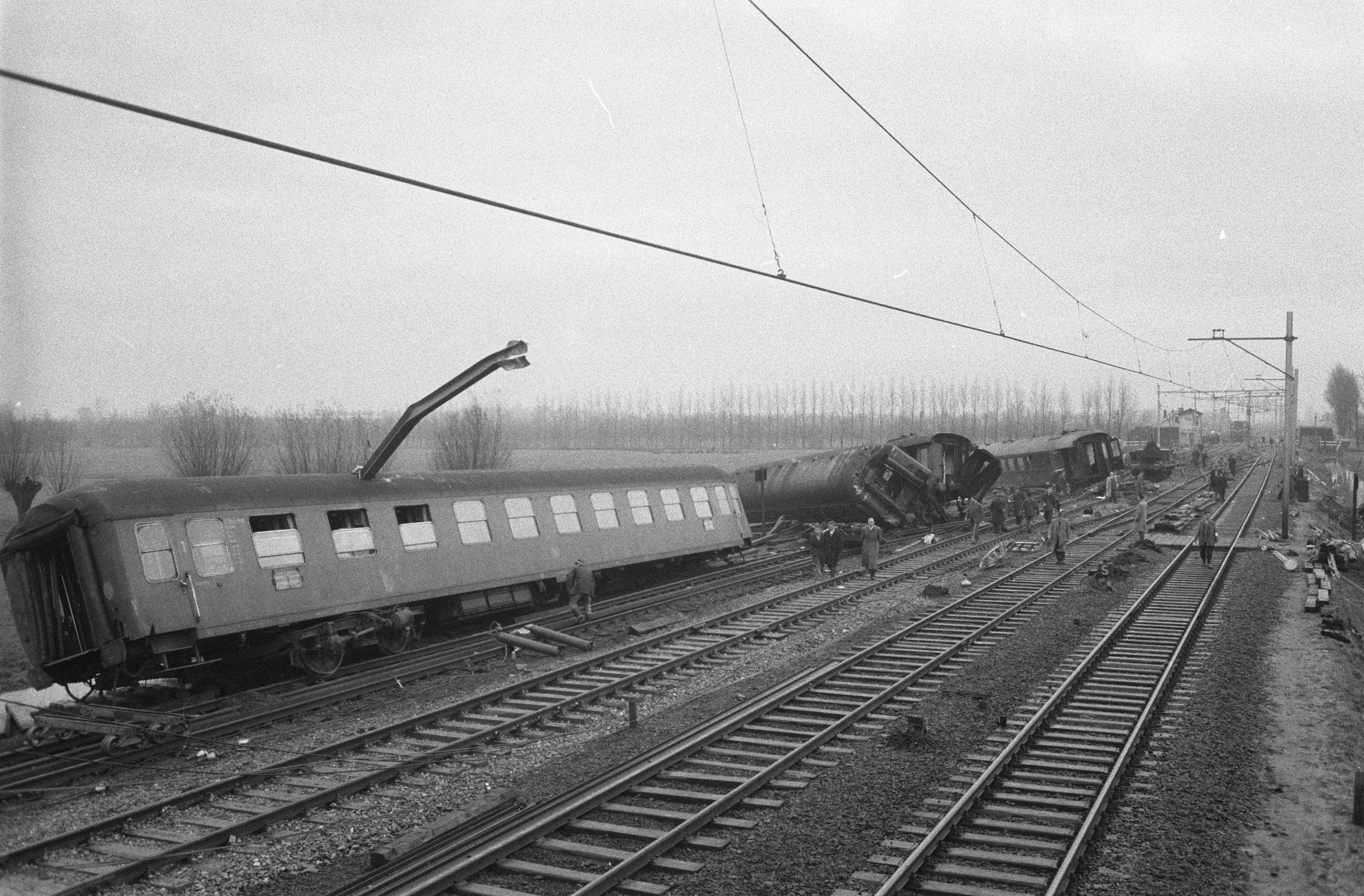

Details
- Date: 21 November 1960; 65 years ago
- Location: Woerden
- Coordinates: 52.1022°N 4.945°E
- Country: Netherlands
- Incident type: Derailment
- Cause: Ignoring temporary speed limit

Statistics
- Trains: 1
- Passengers: 151
- Deaths: 2
- Injured: 3 (seriously) tens (minor)

The Woerden train accident was a railway accident on 21 November 1960 at around 20:10 in Woerden, Netherlands near the Cattenbroek rail crossing.

== Incident ==
The train involved in the crash, a DM80760 / Fac BD, was a British train from Hanover, Germany to Hook of Holland, Netherlands, carrying 151 on-leave British military personnel and their families, including some 10 women and several children. The crash was due to the train driver failing to notice a temporary speed limit and travelling too fast through that section of track. The train broke behind the second carriage and six of the eleven carriages derailed and tilted partially. Two people died, three people were seriously injured and many more received minor injuries.

Ambulances from surrounding towns (Zwammerdam, Woerden, Bodegraven and Utrecht) were summoned. The rescue operation was difficult because the site of the disaster was only accessible via a muddy country road. Initially, people had to be carried by stretcher several hundred metres to the ambulances, although the rescue was subsequently better organized. Some military personnel helped during the rescue operation while others were sent to Woerden railway station. Around 100 Nederlandse Spoorwegen staff started the clear up with cutting torches. Hours after the disaster, the uninjured passengers were taken, by bus, to Gouda whence they were transported to Hook of Holland by train.

The tracks were blocked in both directions. The overhead lines were destroyed and the overhead supports had fallen onto the tracks. The clear up work continued through the night and the following morning, when rail cranes were able to lift some carriages back onto the track. The day after the crash, train traffic resumed on one track while the president of the Nederlandse Spoorwegen, ir. J. Lohman, also visited the disaster site.

== Victims ==
One of the two people who was killed was Heinz Schmodta, a 62-year-old German cook. The other person was Raymond Albert Miller, a 19-year-old British able seaman from Spennymoor, Co. Durham, England. Just before the crash he went to the toilet in the fourth carriage and was crushed by the concertina effect. With the help of cutting torches his body was removed from the train.

The injured included a train guard, who was hurled out of the train.

== Cause ==
Due to track works there was a temporary speed limit of 40 km/h which was indicated with special signs. According to statements, the train was travelling at a speed of 90 km/h at the time of the crash.

== Gallery ==
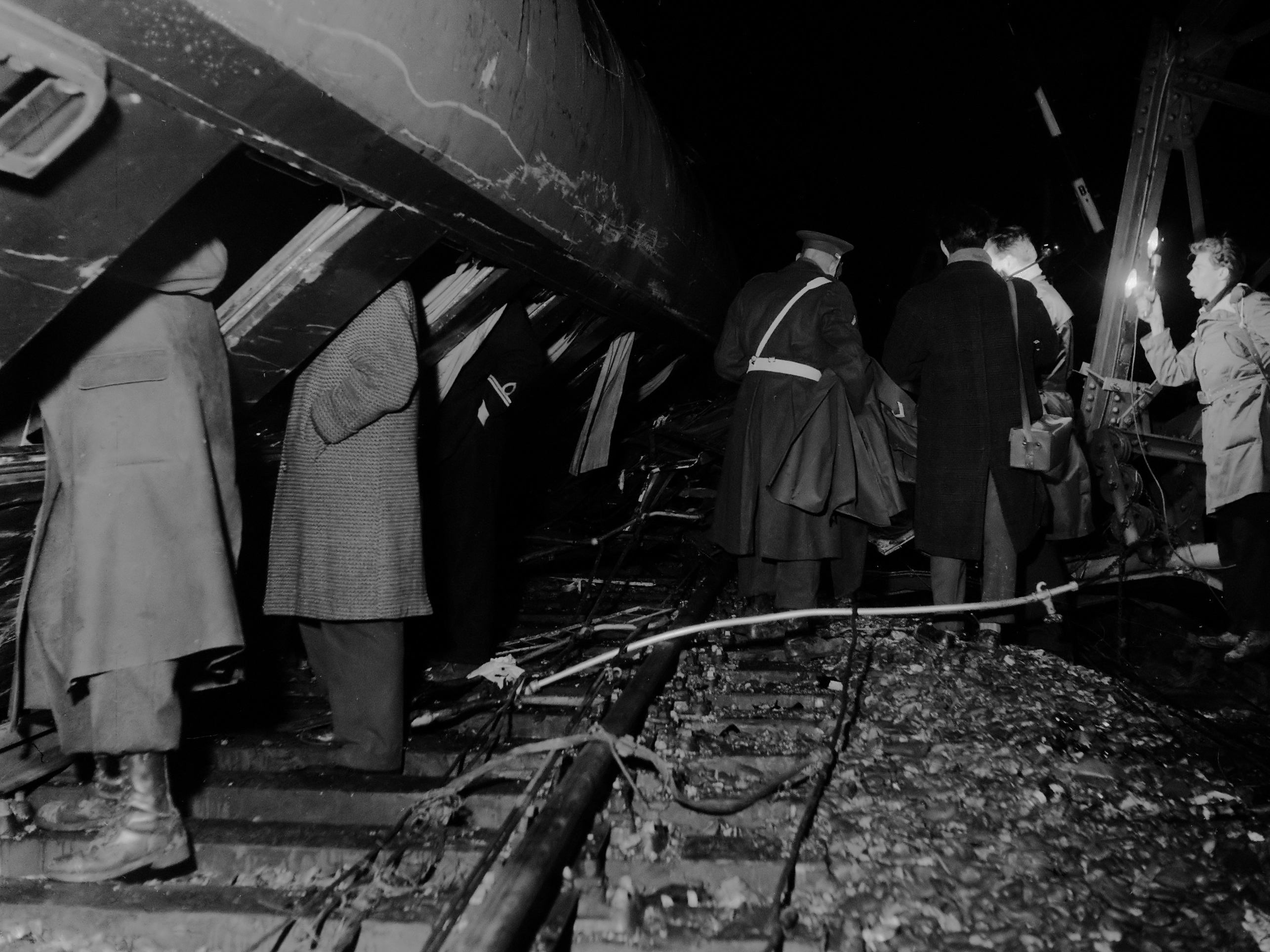
Woerden train disaster (1960)

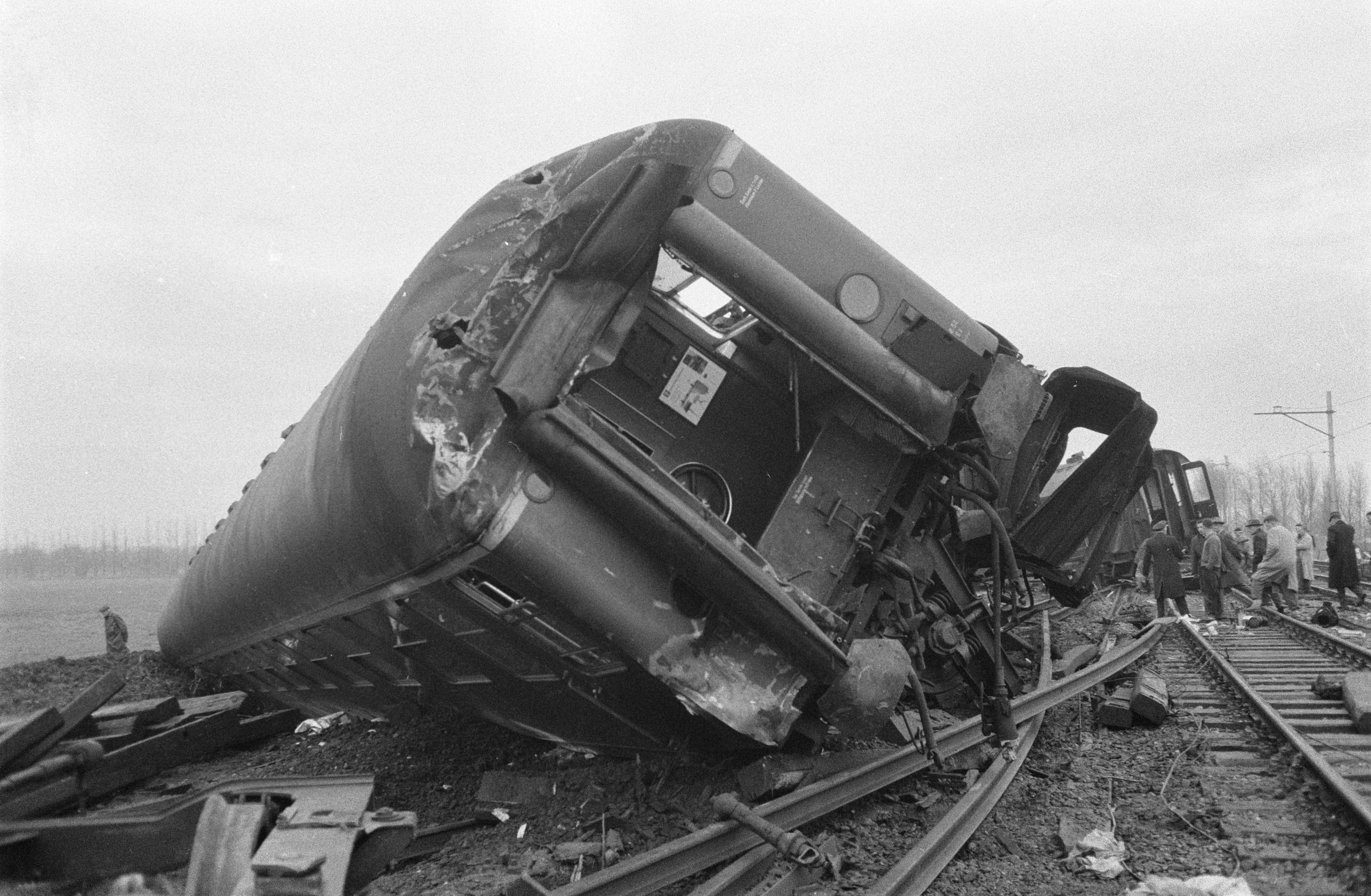
One of the wagons

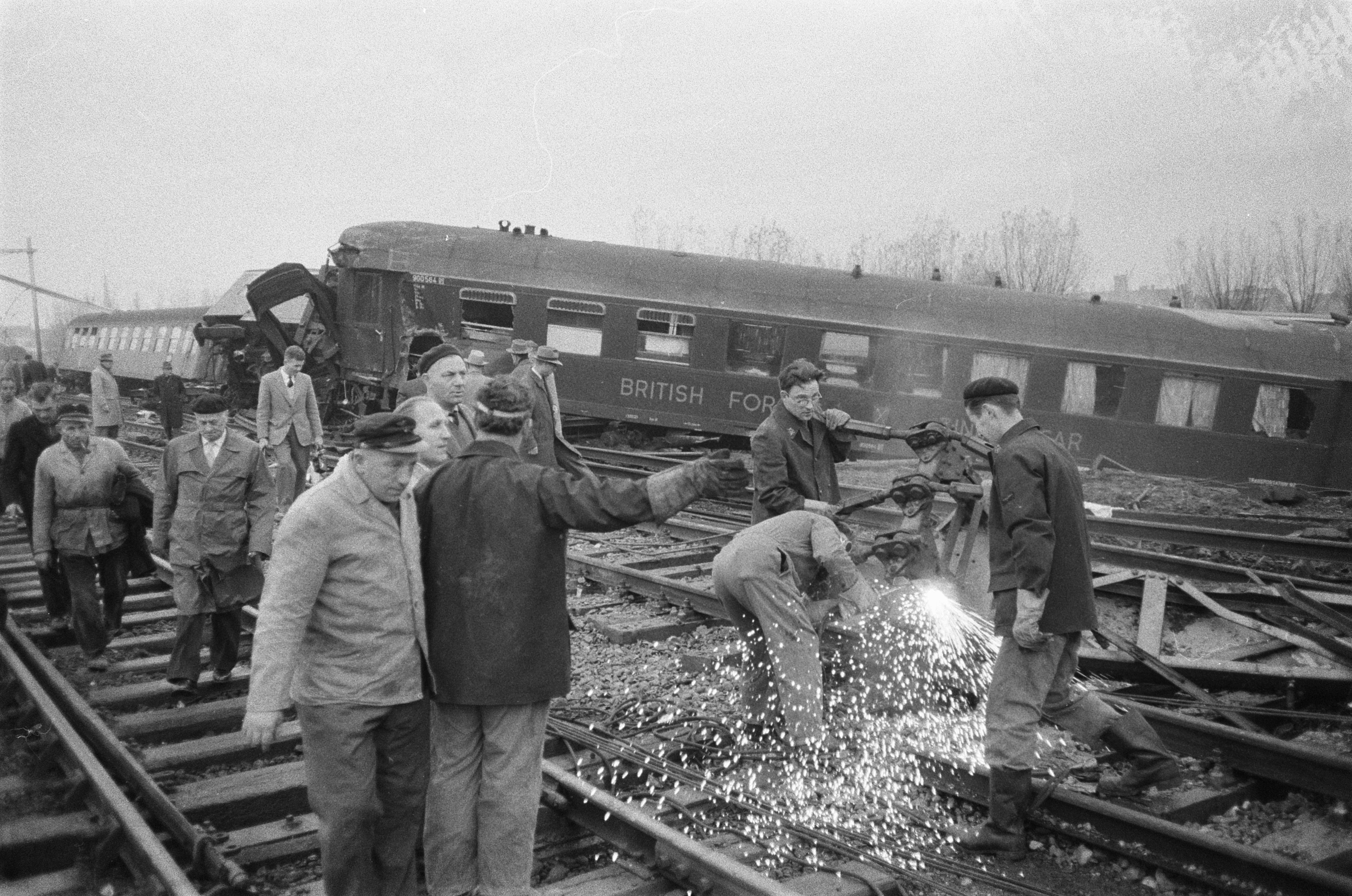
Cleanup work
