= De Windhond =

Windmill in Woerden, Netherlands

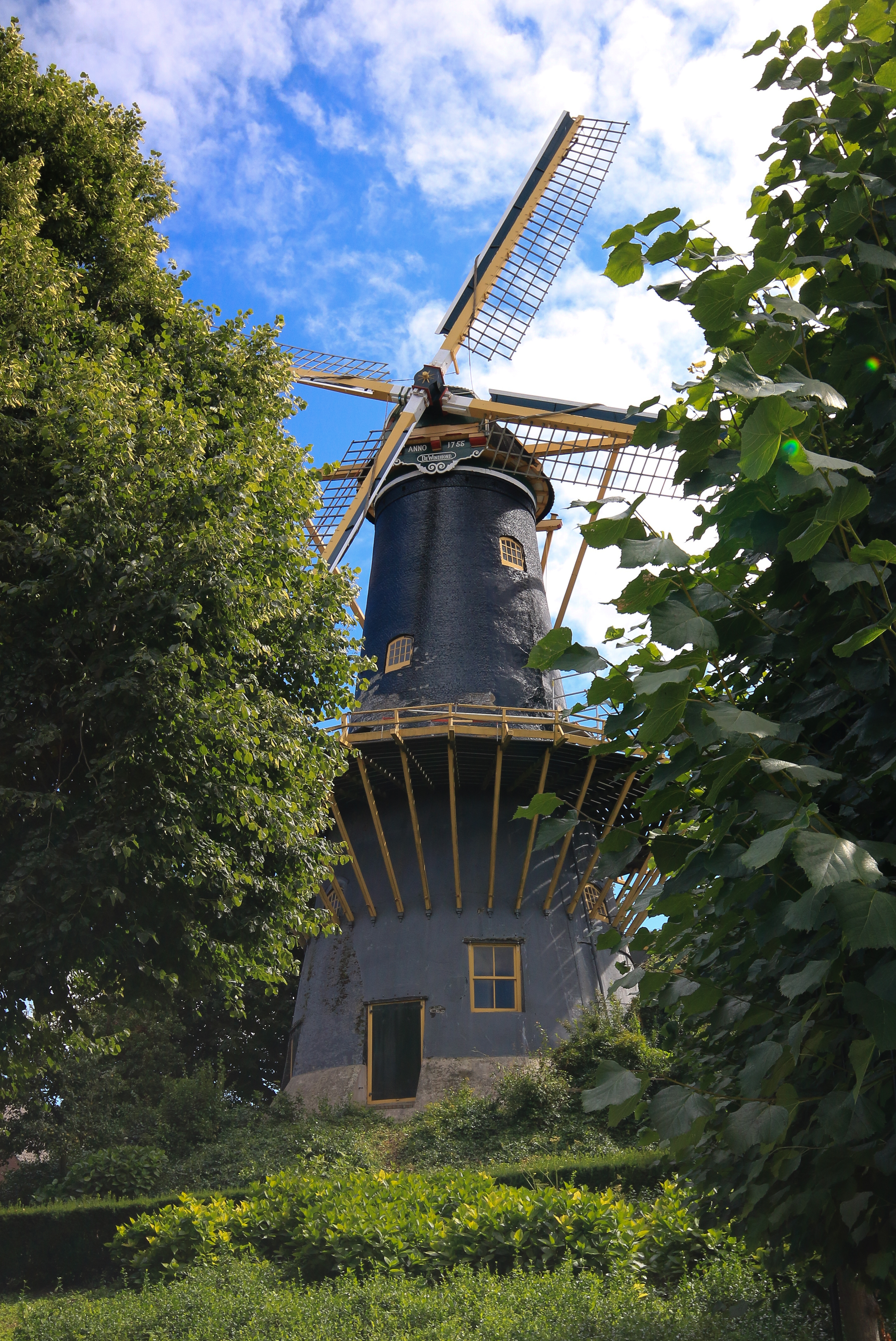
- Windmill seen from North East

Origin
- Mill name: De Windhond
- Mill location: Woerden
- Coordinates: 52.084167°N 4.883331°E
- Year built: 1755

Information
- No. of sails: 4

De Windhond is a windmill in the city of Woerden, Netherlands. The mill was built in 1755 on an artificial hill of 9.3 metres (31 ft) in height that was part of the defensive enclosure (stadswal) of the ancient city. The mill itself is 5.7 metres (19 ft) high. The windmill sail spans 25.2 metres (83 ft).

The building is a prominent feature defining the skyline of the town. It is registered as a national monument.

== History ==
When the mill was built, it replaced an older mill that was on the same location. In 1877 the mill got a steam engine and in 1901 a gas turbine. In 1984 the mill was restructured, to be used as gristmill, and although the gas turbine still works today, the mill is usually operated by wind. The interior of the mill is pretty much in an original state, and until 2011 the miller lived in the house at the foot. The municipality of Woerden has owned the windmill since 1977.

== Gallery ==
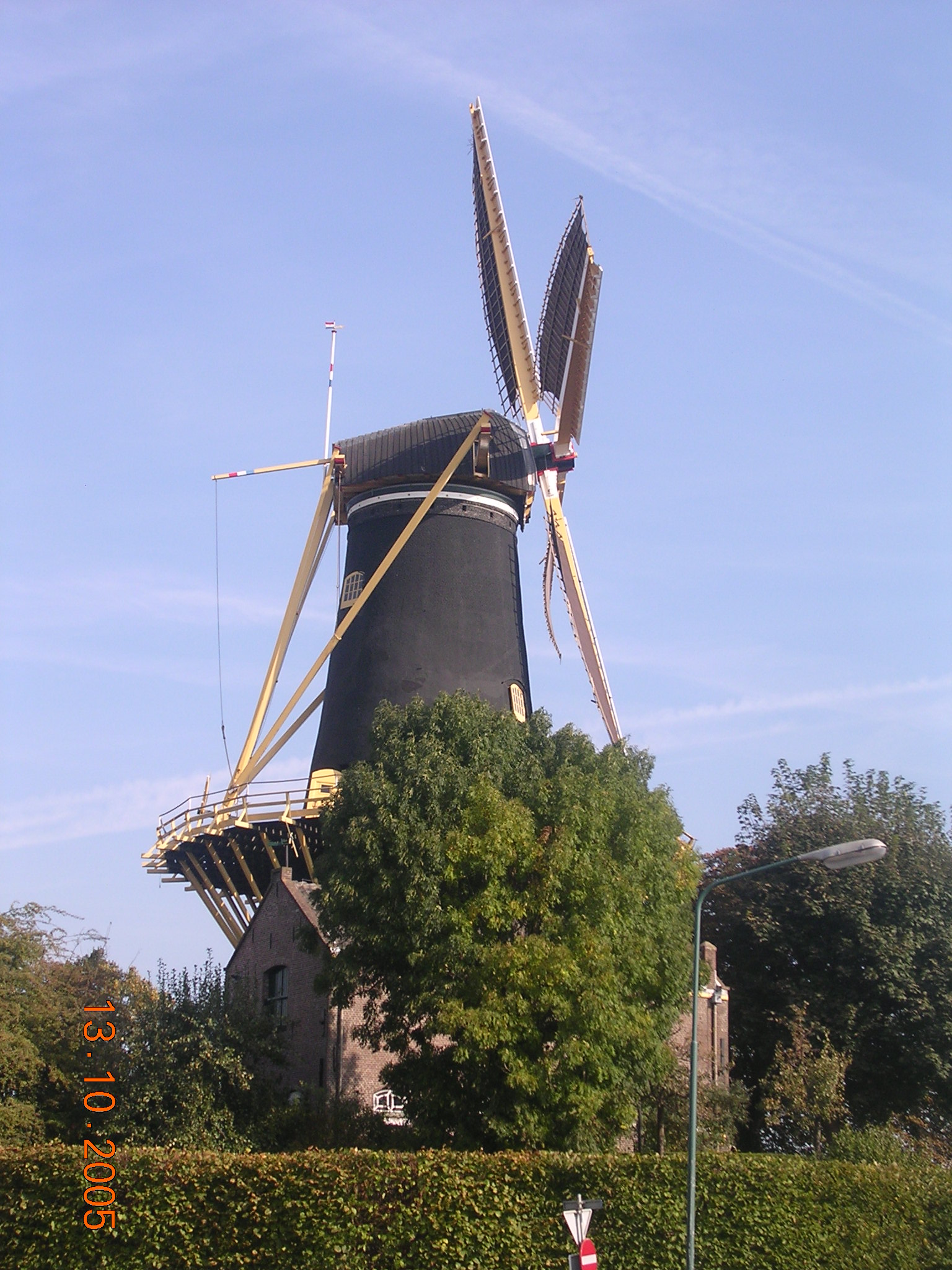
Windmill seen from bridge at South East

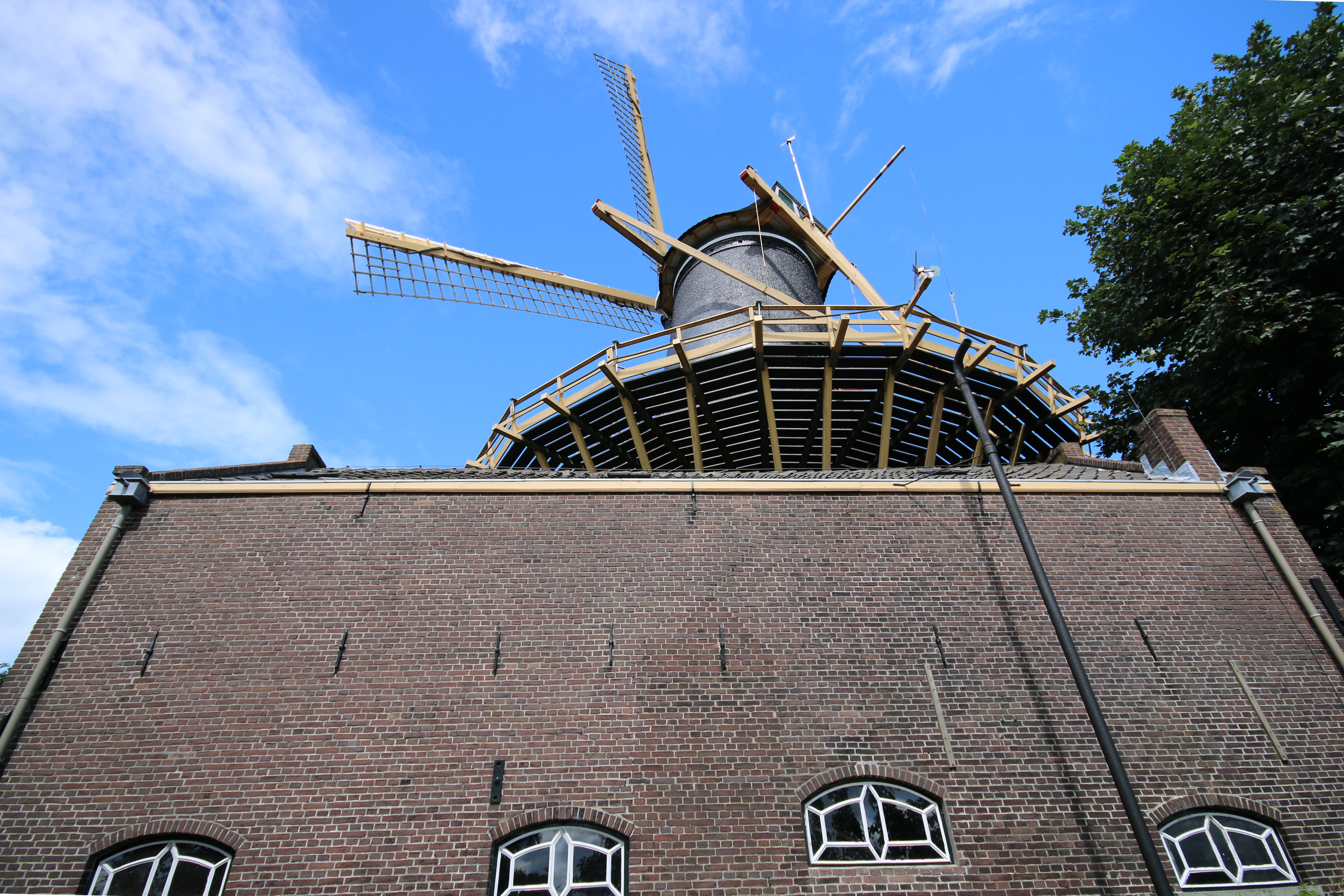
Windmill and substructure

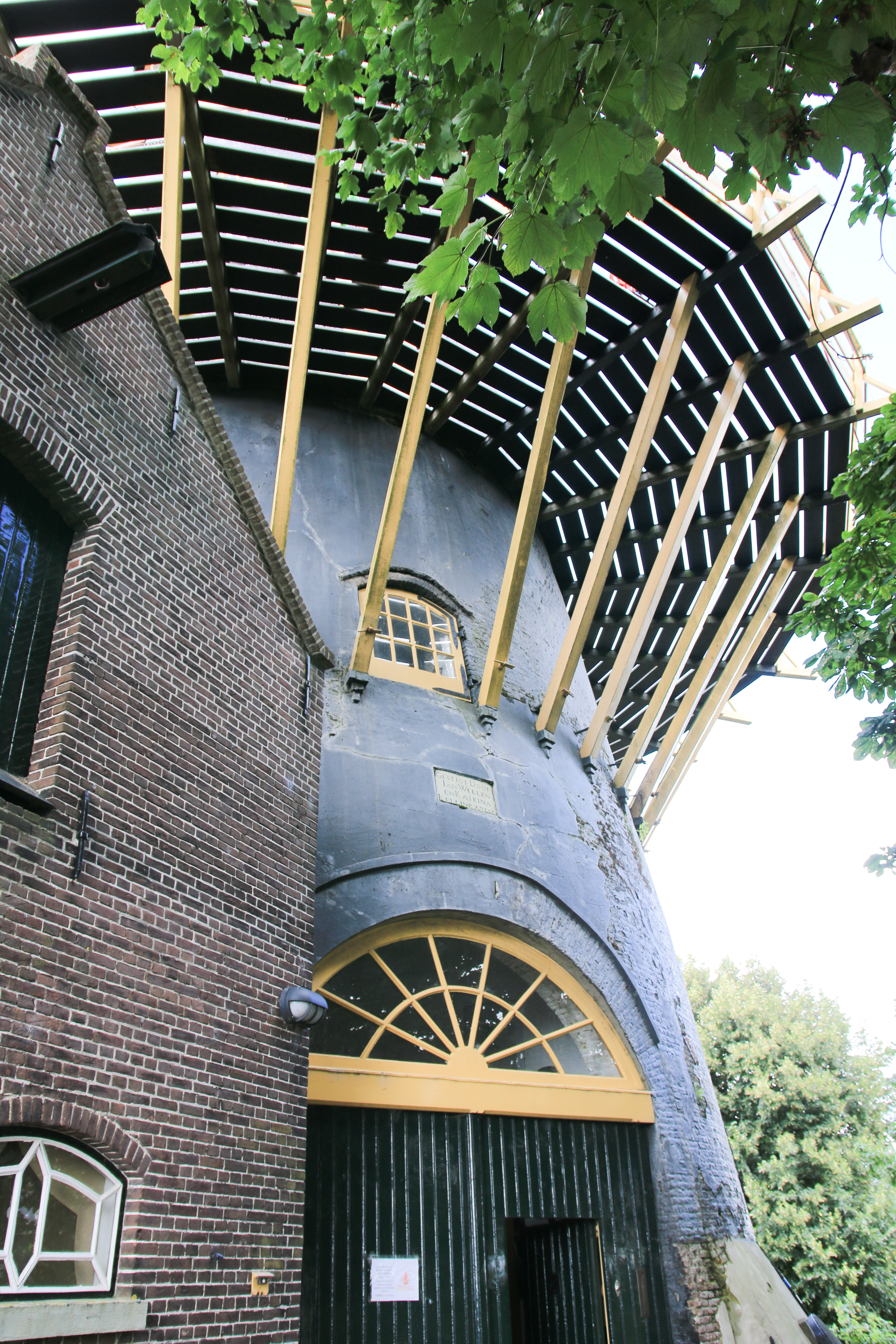
Entrance

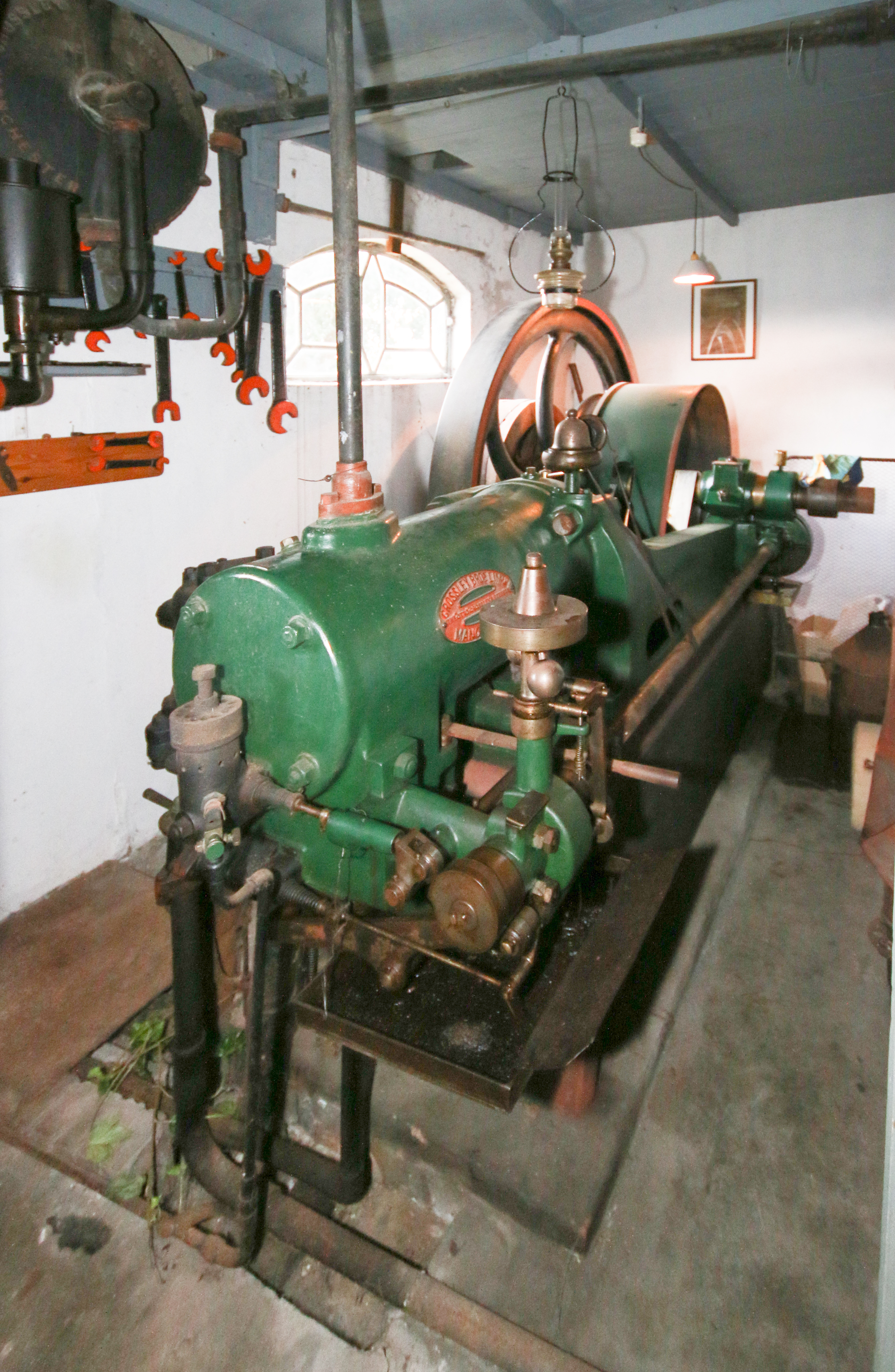
Gas turbine
