= Woerden =

City and Municipality in Utrecht, Netherlands

- City and Municipality
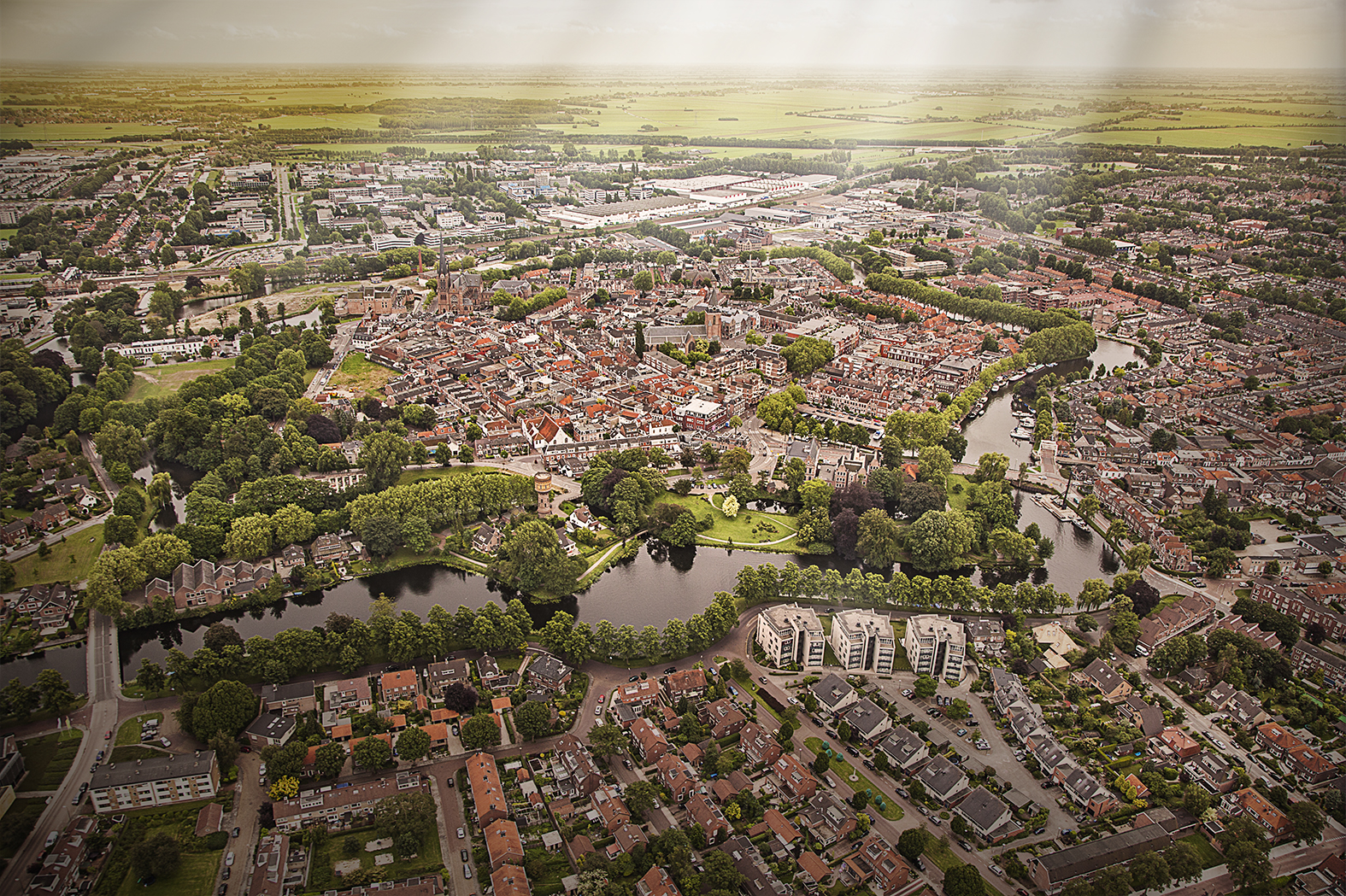
- Aerial view of Woerden in 2013

- Flag Coat of arms

- Location in Utrecht
- Coordinates: 52°5′N 4°53′E
- Country: Netherlands
- Province: Utrecht

Government
  - Body: Municipal council
  - Mayor: Victor Molkenboer (PvdA)

Area
  - Total: 92.92 km^{2} (35.88 sq mi)
  - Land: 88.57 km^{2} (34.20 sq mi)
  - Water: 4.35 km^{2} (1.68 sq mi)
- Elevation: 0 m (0 ft)

Population (January 2021)
  - Total: 52,694
  - Density: 595/km^{2} (1,540/sq mi)
- Demonym: Woerdenaar
- Time zone: UTC+1 (CET)
  - Summer (DST): UTC+2 (CEST)
- Postcode: 3440–3449, 3470–3481
- Area code: 0348
- Website: www.woerden.nl

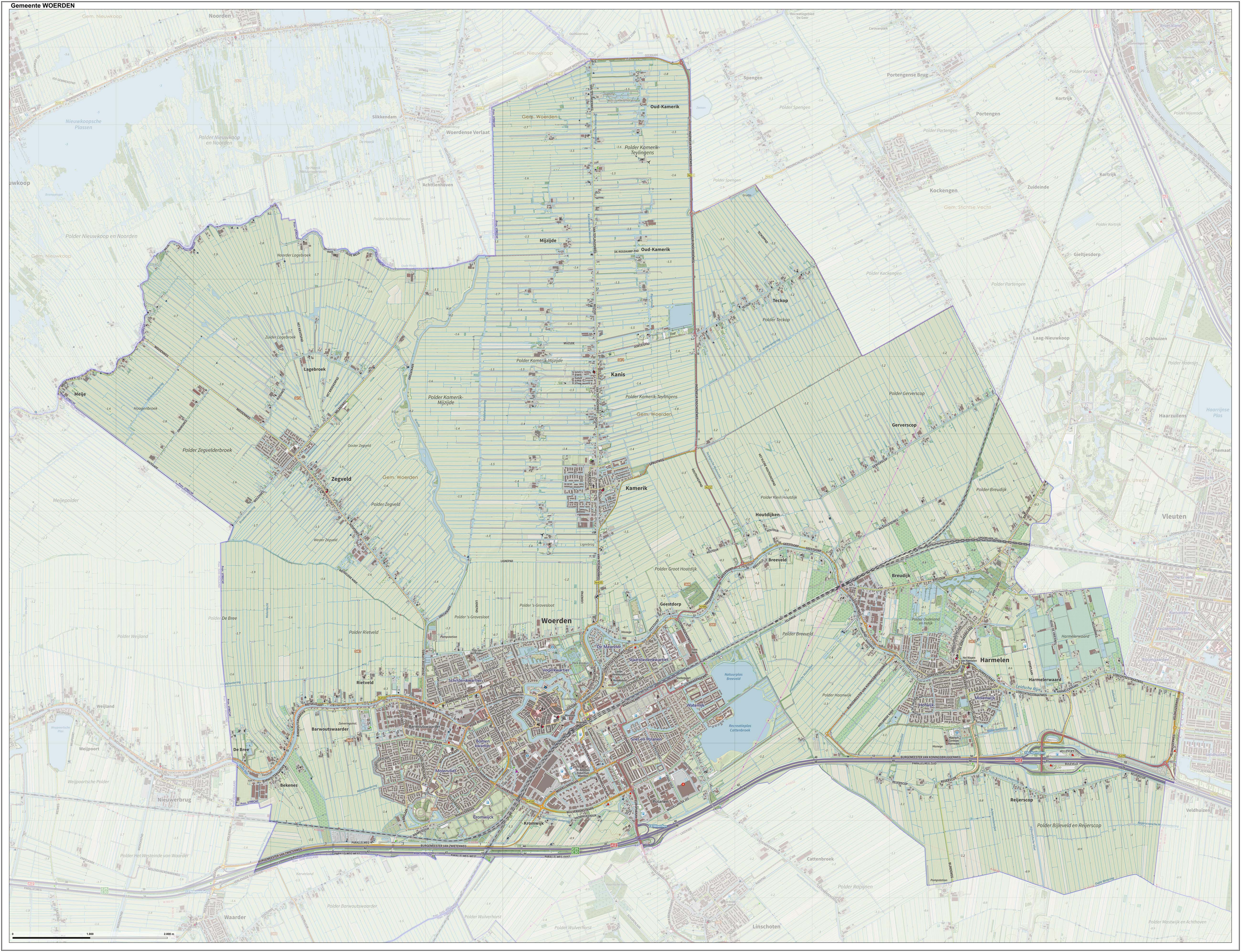
2014 topographic map of the municipality of Woerden

Woerden (Dutch pronunciation: [ˈʋuːrdə(n)]) is a city and a municipality in the Province of Utrecht in the central Netherlands, 15 km west of Utrecht and 32 km south of Amsterdam.

== History ==
The river Oude Rijn used to flow through the city center of Woerden, but in 1960 the old river was diverted around the city center. The city has a long and rich history in cheese making and trading; for years Gouda cheese for domestic and international use has been produced in this region. Woerden still holds its authentic (since 1885) cheese market at the market place in its center.

=== Roman castellum ===
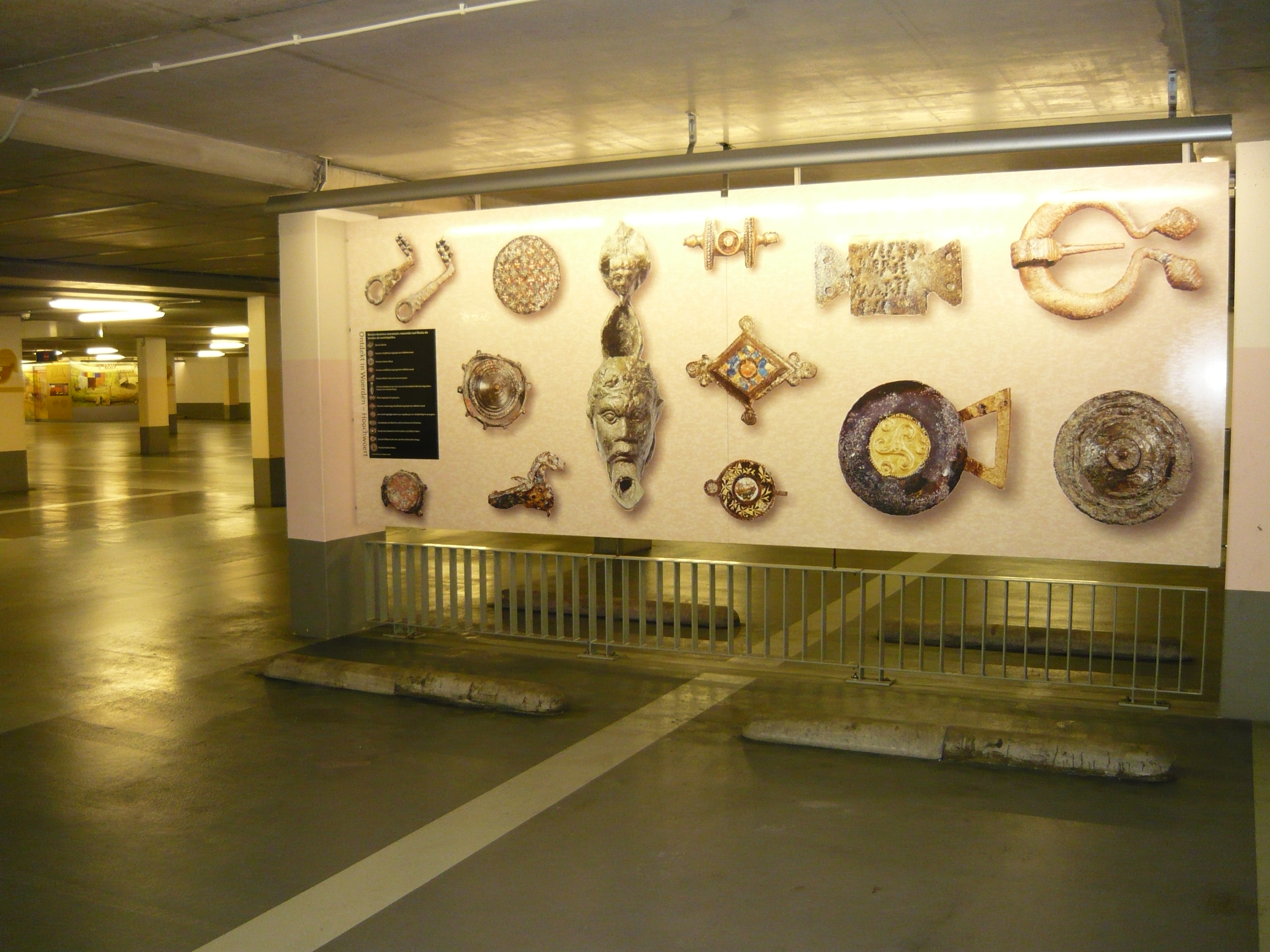
Underground parking facility Castellum with photos of Roman archeological finds

Woerden is situated on the river Oude Rijn, near the confluence with the former Linschoten (water) stream. The lower stretch of the Linschoten stream from Montfoort and Linschoten to Woerden silted up a long time ago and its flow was diverted through the Lek and Hollandse IJssel rivers, but at one time it was an important branch of the Rhine delta, connecting the Lower Rhine from Wijk bij Duurstede to the Oude Rijn near Woerden. Near the former confluence was an area that was slightly more elevated than the surroundings, a natural levee, which — in an area that is prone to flooding — made it an attractive location for settlement.

Here, at the highest spot, the Romans built a castellum (Castellum Laurum), as part of the limes of the Roman Empire and thus part of the defense lines of the northern border of the Roman Empire. The first castellum was built in the 40s AD and was destroyed in 69 AD during the Batavian rebellion. In 70 AD, the castellum was rebuilt, and the Romans remained until 402 AD, with an interruption lasting from about 275-300 AD.

The Castellum was located at the present site of the medieval Petruschurch and surrounding churchyard. During construction work on a new underground parking facility in the city center of Woerden, the remains of numerous old Roman buildings and a Roman cargo ship were found. During field research, a lot became known about the Roman time in Woerden: the location of the castellum, the zone of defense waters with the entrance road and the remains of a Roman cargo ship.

=== Post Roman period ===
Little is known about the period after the Romans left in 402 AD. It may be assumed that people continued to live here, but there is little archaeological evidence. A Frankish sword dated from the 8th century has been found on the site of the Roman Castellum in 2012. The area was contested between Frisians and Franks. Frankish King Dagobert I conquered the area around 630, and a small church was built in nearby Utrecht. Around 650, the Frisians came back, destroyed the Frankish church in Utrecht, and the Frisian king established his court there. Then, in 689 king Redbad was defeated by Frankish Duke Pippin of Herstal in the battle of Dorestad and the Franks regained control of the area. King Redbad reconquered Utrecht after Pippin died in 714, but the Frisian victory was short-lived: Duke Charles Martel defeated Redbad in 718. In 734, Charles Martel went on to vanquish the Frisians, in the Battle of the Boarn.

The missionaries followed in the footsteps of the Frankish conquerors: In 695 AD, Willibrord, known as the "Apostle to the Frisians" became Bishop of Utrecht, with interruptions due to Frisian incursions. Boniface worked here from 719 to 722. Liudger reports that Boniface preached in Wyrda, referring to Wierde, meaning that the place was on higher ground in the area. Around 850, the Bishop had to leave once more, this time because of Viking marauders. Bishop Balderik returned to Utrecht in 918, after the Viking threat subsided. The Bishop claims Woerden as part of his jurisdiction: In a list prepared between 918 and 948 it is mentioned that In UUrdin totum Sancti Martini, meaning: In Woerden everything belongs to Saint Martin, i.e. the church in Utrecht.

=== Between bishop and count ===
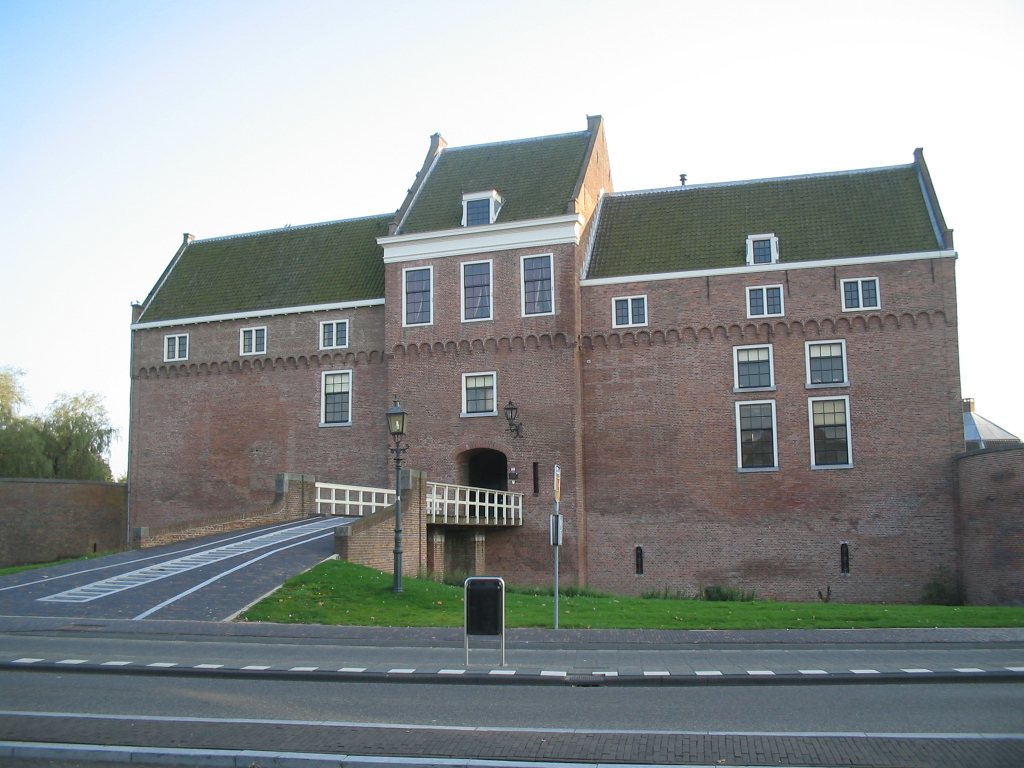
Castle of Woerden

The Bishop of Utrecht received land grants, first from the Frankish kings, and later from the Kings of Germany, in particular Otto I, Holy Roman Emperor. In 1024 AD, the bishops were made Princes of the Holy Roman Empire and the new Prince-bishopric of Utrecht was formed.

Around 1000 AD, settlement was limited to the river banks; further inland were undeveloped bogs. The bishops used their new authority to stimulate reclamation of this wilderness. Concessions were granted to settlers, who drained the bogs by digging dividing ditches beginning from rivers and streams and stretching about ¾ mile inland, thus creating the characteristic grid of fields still seen today. By about 1300 AD, the reclamation process had been completed.

In the meantime, a competing realm had developed to the west, along the coast. First known as West Frisia it became known as Holland when Floris II, Count of Holland moved his court to Leiden in 1101. The Counts of Holland expanded their influence, and by 1165 they built a fort called Svadeburg, near present-day Zwammerdam, about 7 miles to the west of Woerden. Around 1160, Bishop Godfrey van Rhenen built a castle in Woerden. Once more Woerden became a border town between two belligerent powers, a situation that lasted until 1527 when the Bishop of Utrecht sold his territories to Emperor Charles V and the two statelets were united under Charles' rule. Due to its strategic location on the border between the County of Holland and the Bishopric of Utrecht, various wars have been fought in and around Woerden by the various lords and ladies of these realms.

From about 1131 to 1296, the van Woerden family dominated local affairs in Woerden. Several scions of the family are known as Herman van Woerden. Originally they were stewards of the castle for the Bishop, but in time they sought to become independent. In 1274 Herman VI van Woerden formed an alliance with Gijsbrecht IV van Amstel, and revolted against bishop-elect John of Nassau. In 1278, Floris V, Count of Holland, intervened on the side of the much-weakened bishop, and defeated the rebellious lords. Gijsbrecht was taken prisoner, and Herman went into exile. In 1281, Floris V was awarded the lands of the rebellious lords, including Amsterdam and Woerden. In a 1288 peace agreement Floris restored the Lordship of Woerden to Herman van Woerden, but now as a vassal of the count. However, Herman did not prove himself to be a trustworthy vassal: in 1296 the humiliated lords Gijsbrecht IV van Amstel and Herman van Woerden entered the scene again as part of a conspiracy. Together with Gerard van Velzen they captured count Floris during a hunting party and the count was assassinated. In the aftermath, Gerard van Velzen was killed, and Herman van Woerden went again into exile. In 1300, John II, Count of Holland awarded the Lordship of Woerden to his brother Guy of Avesnes, who became Bishop of Utrecht the following year. In 1311, Guy returned the Lordship to his nephew, Count William III, and Woerden remained part of Holland thereafter.

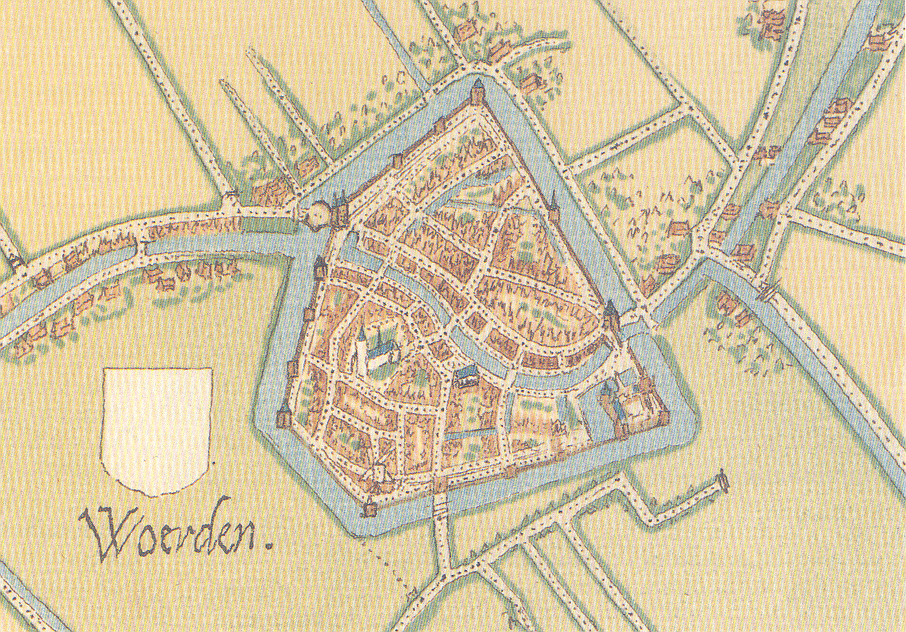
Map of Woerden (c. 1557)

Around 1370 bailiff Willem II van Naaldwijk ordered the construction of defensive walls and a moat to fortify the city, in order to shield Holland from renewed hostilities with Utrecht. Woerden received city rights from Albert I, Duke of Bavaria, and Count of Holland in 1372, even though Woerden was still a small town that harboured no more than about 720 citizens. Around the same time the Petruschurch was built; part of its steeple still stands. In 1410 John III, Duke of Bavaria-Straubing had the castle of Woerden constructed, and in 1510 the city hall was built. These buildings still exist, although the castle was extensively altered and renovated through the years.

On 1 November 1425, Woerden chose the side of Philip the Good in the conflict with Jacoba van Beieren, after Philip confirmed the town privileges and promised that the Lordship of Woerden would never be separated from the County of Holland by awarding it to someone else. During the reign of the Dukes of Burgundy, Philip the Good (1419–1467) and Charles the Bold (1467–1477) Woerden enjoyed an unprecedented period of peace, and by 1477 its population had almost tripled to about 1920. Charles the Bold's death before the gates of Nancy was the prelude to renewed unrest, both with Utrecht and the duchy of Guelders, and the town suffered economic hardship because of it.

=== Heretics and rebels ===
Erasmus probably spent his boyhood from age five to nine in Woeden in the household of his father, the local priest from 1471.

The reign of Charles V was a period of relative peace and prosperity for Woerden, despite religious unrest. In April 1522, Charles V introduced the Inquisition in the Low Countries.

Johannes Pistorius Woerdensis (Jan de Bakker), a catholic priest, was the first preacher in the Northern Netherlands to be martyred as a direct result of his religious beliefs. His father was a sexton in Woerden and also tenant of the brickworks, and his surname was derived from that profession.

Jan de Bakker was a pupil of Hinne Rode (Johannes Rhodius), headmaster of St. Jerome School of the Brethren of the Common Life in Utrecht. Rode was a proponent of Sacramentarianism, and in 1520 his father called Jan back to Woerden, perhaps out of concern about those heretic views. Jan transferred to Leuven, and in 1522 completed his education there. He returned to Woerden, was ordained in Utrecht as a priest, and assisted his father as sexton and deacon.

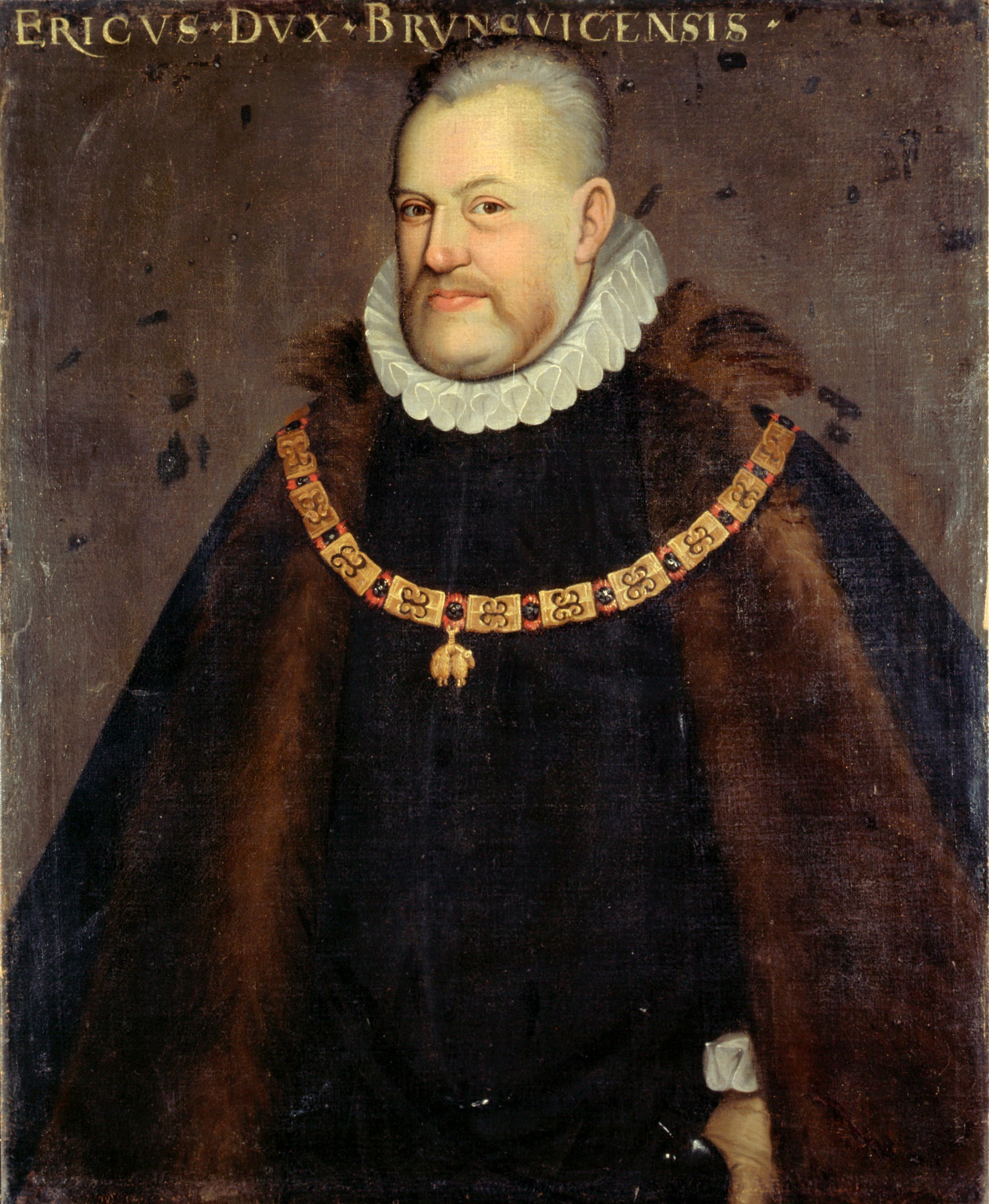
Eric II, Duke of Brunswick-Lüneburg with the collar of the Order of the Golden Fleece, awarded in 1573 by Philip II of Spain for his services as army commander.

Jan started to spread the heretic views, and in May 1523 he and another priest were arrested by the steward of the castle. After a short while they were released, and it is thought that the two travelled to Wittenberg, but there is no evidence he met with Martin Luther. After he returned he continued his preachings, and the conflict with the Roman Catholic Church was further aggravated by the fact that he broke his celibacy, and got married. In the night of 9 May 1525, he was arrested and the next day transferred to The Hague, where he appeared before the Inquisition. He was defrocked and sentenced to death, and on 15 September 1525 burned at the stake in The Hague. His widow saved her live by recanting the heresies and lived out her life in an abbey.

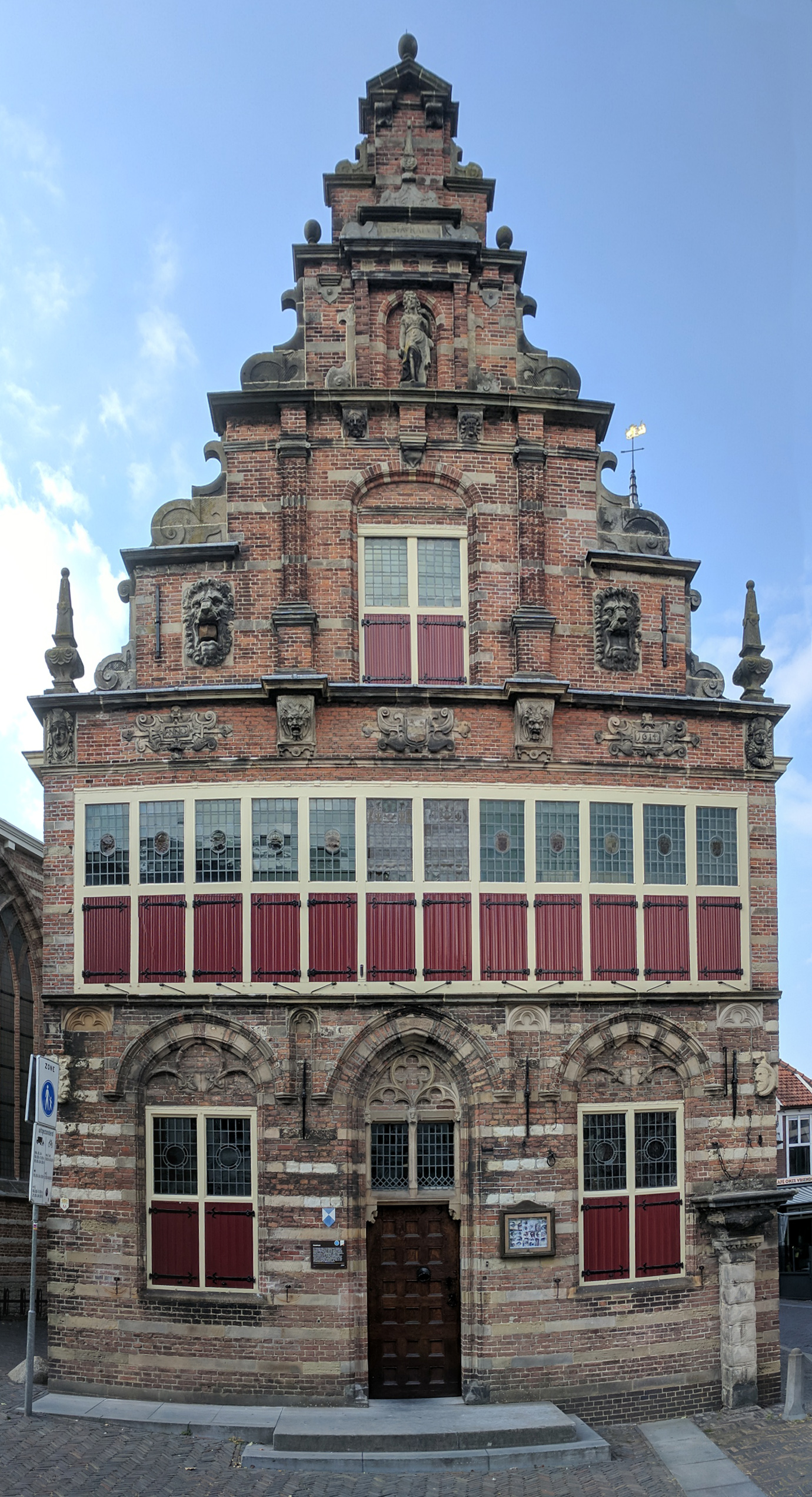
The old stadhuis (city hall) in Woerden, now a museum

The city magistrates of Woerden were tolerant towards the Lutheran confession. In 1566 this resulted in a confrontation with duke Eric of Brunswick, who was Lord of Woerden at that time.

Although Eric of Brunswick was raised Lutheran he converted to Catholicism in 1547, much to the regret of his mother Elisabeth of Brandenburg. Eric served as commanding officer in the armies of Charles V and Philip II, and fought on their side in the Schmalkaldic War (1546–1547) and the Franco-Habsburg War (1551–1559). During the Battle of St. Quentin (1557) he distinguished himself by taking French Marshals Anne de Montmorency and Jacques d'Albon de Saint-André prisoner. These prisoners were very important to Philip II as a bargaining chip during negotiations for the peace Treaty of Cateau-Cambrésis. In 1558, Philip II granted Duke Eric of Brunswick the Lordship of Woerden as compensation, over the objection of the city magistrates of Woerden who felt that this was an infringement of promises made by Philip the Good in 1425.

In the wake of iconoclastic riots that swept the country in 1566 a prominent citizen of Woerden, Warnaer Claesz, petitioned the city magistrates to introduce the Augsburg Confession. There was also a disruption of the church worship. As a precaution, the city magistrates removed icons and other valuables from the church and stored them in a safe place, and closed the church. The court of Holland concurred with the actions taken by the city magistrates, but Duke Eric of Brunswick objected. He demanded that Catholic worship would be restored. The city magistrates delayed by questioning his authority in this matter. Duke Eric responded by raising a small army and forced the city magistrates to comply.

Duke Eric was also instrumental in suppressing the ill-fated rebellion of Hendrik van Brederode, Lord of Vianen. After the rebel army was defeated in the Battle of Oosterweel (13 March 1567) Eric of Brunswick captured Vianen on May 5, 1567.

In later history, the town saw occupation by the Spanish (1575, 1576) and the French (1672, 1673, and particularly disastrous in 1813).

=== Modern era ===
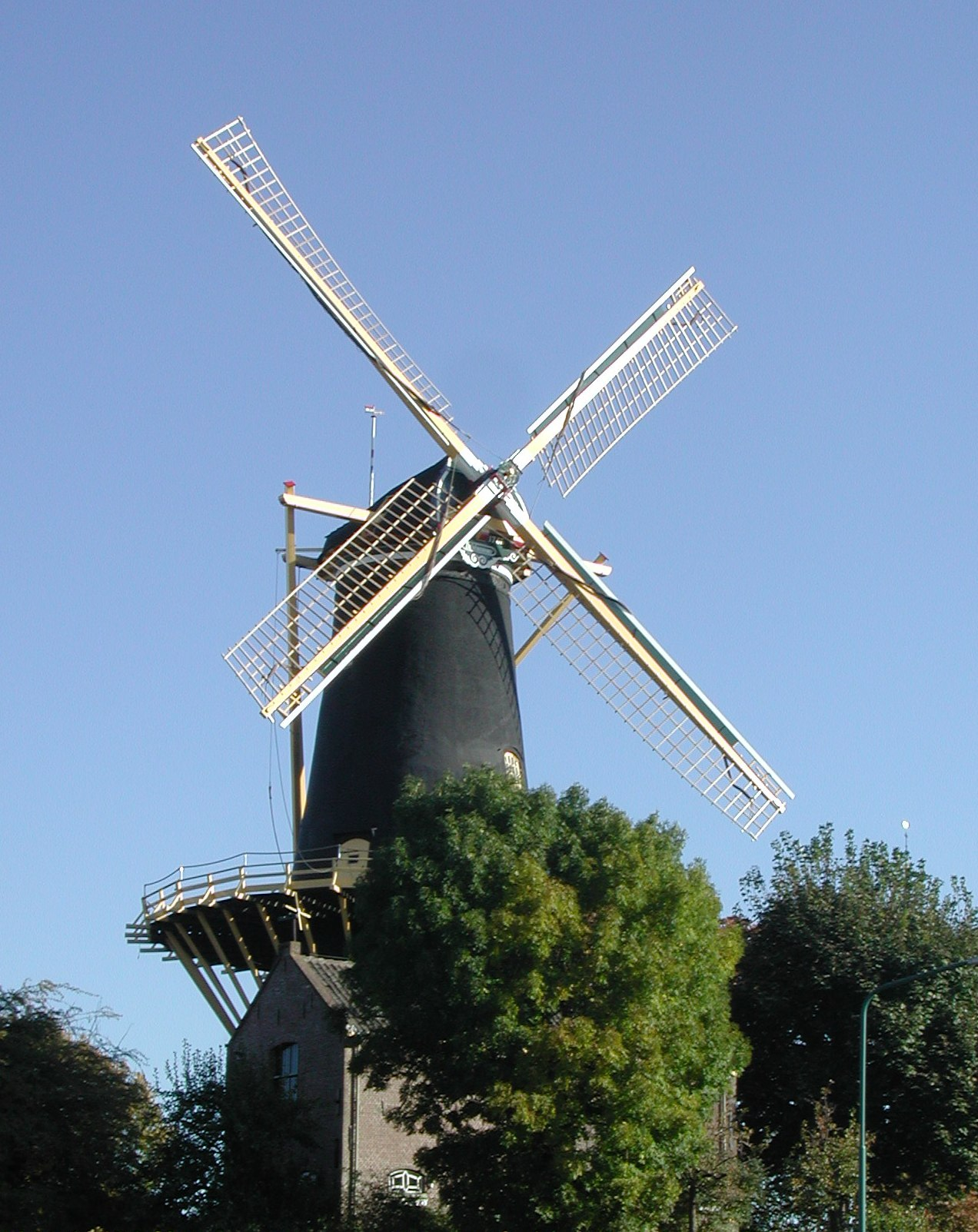
"De Windhond", a gristmill in the center of Woerden

In 1989, there was a local redrawing of province boundaries as a result of which Woerden found itself transferred from South Holland to the province of Utrecht. In 2015, the city's refugee centre formed the scene of a violent attack by 20 hooded people, bearing fireworks and pushing down fences.

== Geography ==
Woerden is located at 52°5′N 4°53′E in the west of the province of Utrecht in the center of the Netherlands.

Woerden is bordered by the municipalities of De Ronde Venen (in the north), Stichtse Vecht (northeast), Utrecht (east), and Montfoort (south) in the province of Utrecht and Bodegraven-Reeuwijk (southwest) and Nieuwkoop (northwest) in the province of South Holland.

The population centers in the municipality are De Meije, Harmelen, Kamerik, Kanis, Woerden, and Zegveld.

== Notable people ==
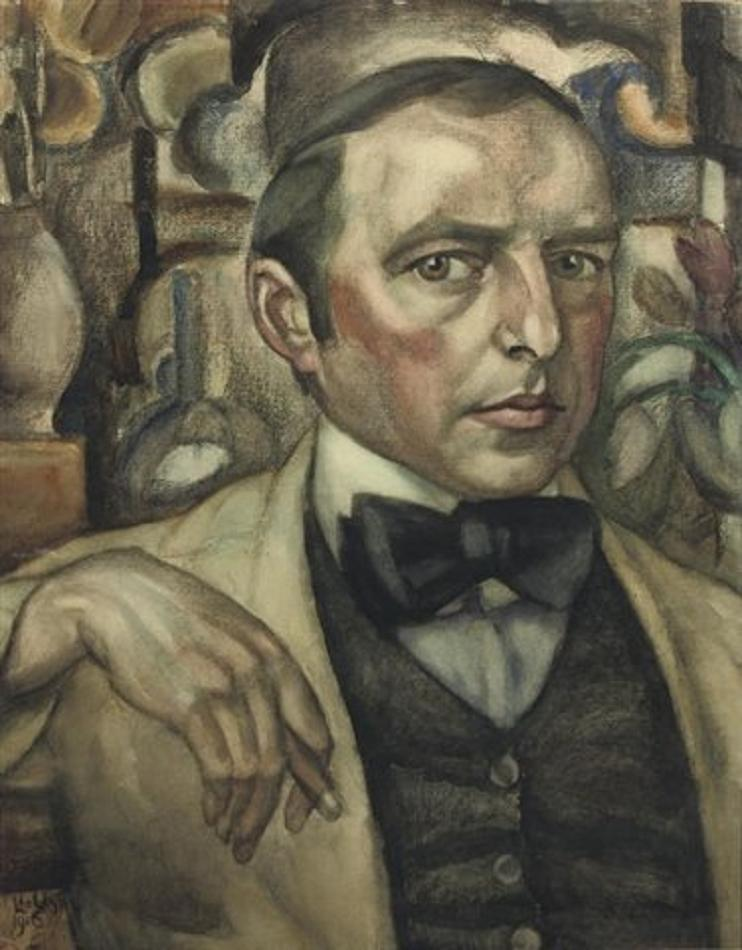
Self Portrait of Leo Gestel, 1916

- Jan de Bakker (1499–1525), Protestant martyr
- Herman van Swanevelt (1603–1655), painter and etcher from the Baroque era
- Leo Gestel (1881-1941), Dutch modernist painter
- Herman de Man (1898–1946), novelist
- Jaap Blonk (born 1953), composer and performance artist
- Gerda Verburg (born 1957) politician and diplomat, lives in Woerden
- Simone Angel (born 1971), TV host and singer

=== Sport ===
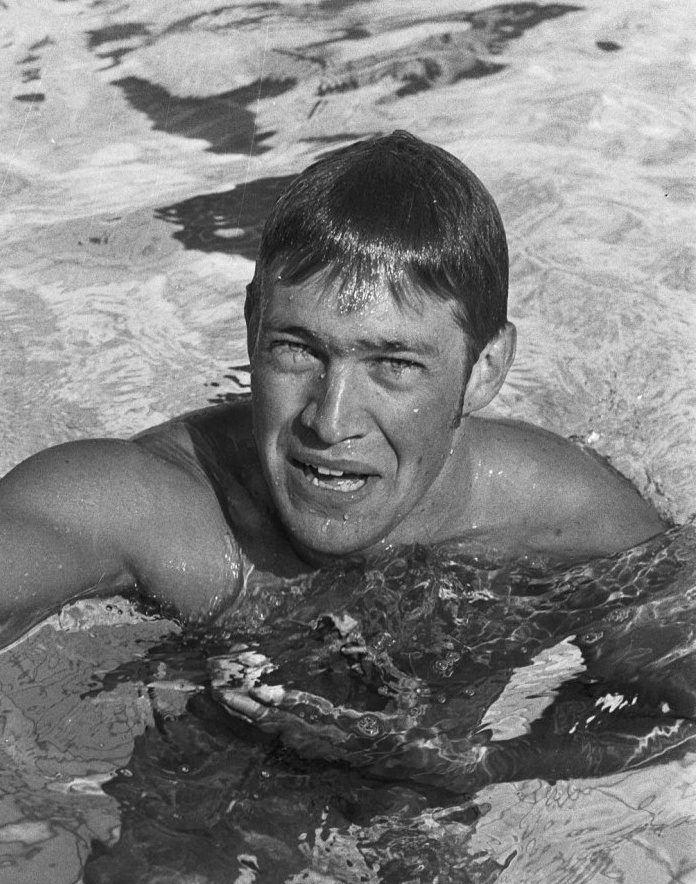
Peter Prijdekker, 1971

- Arie van Vliet (1916–2001), track cyclist, medallist at the 1936 Summer Olympics
- Peter Prijdekker (born 1948), freestyle swimmer, competed at the 1972 Summer Olympics
- Sam Oud (born 1978) slalom canoeist, competed at the 2004 Summer Olympics
- Esther Vergeer (born 1981), wheelchair tennis player
- Erwin l'Ami (born 1985) chess grandmaster.
- Petra Hillenius (1968–2020), breaststroke swimmer, competed at the 1984 Summer Olympics
- Anouk Hoogendijk (born 1985), international footballer
- Jiske Griffioen (born 1985) former wheelchair tennis player, three-time Paralympic medalist.
- Ellen van Dijk (born 1987), professional racing cyclist
- Floortje Mackaij (born 1995), professional racing cyclist

== Buildings in Woerden ==
- Water Tower Woerden

== Schools in Woerden ==
- Kalsbeek College
- Minkema College
- Futura College

== Transportation ==
- Woerden railway station

=== Rail accidents ===
- Woerden train accident (November 1960), an accident with a British furlough train (2 deaths, 10 injured)
- Harmelen train disaster (January 1962), head-on collision, the worst railway accident in the history of the Netherlands (93 deaths)
