= Minkema College =

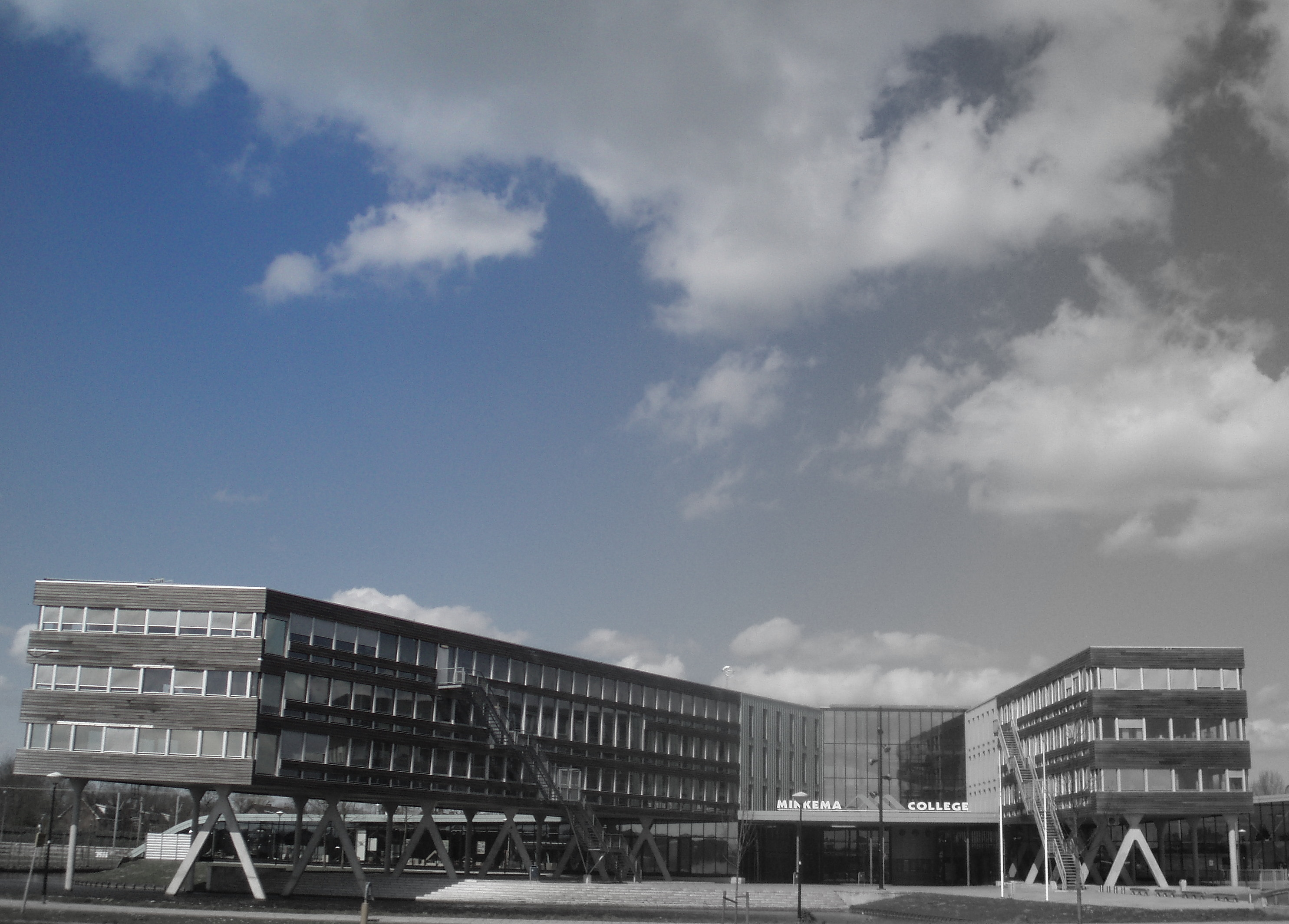
- Location Steinhagenseweg

Location
- Minkemalaan and Steinhagenseweg; Woerden; Netherlands

Information
- Type: High school
- Age: 12 to 18
- Website: http://www.minkema.nl/

Minkema College is a secondary school in the city of Woerden, Netherlands. The school has two locations—on Minkemalaan (52.0845°N 4.8961°E) and on Steinhagenseweg (52.0892°N 4.9085°E)—teaching all forms of Dutch secondary education.

== Notable alumni ==
- Jiske Griffioen, professional wheelchair tennis player
- Ellen van Dijk, multiple road and track cycling world champion
- Simon van der Geest, writer and poet
- Esther Vergeer, Dutch former professional wheelchair tennis player
- Loes Ypma, Dutch politician
- Regina Van Eijk, Dutch professional goalkeeper

== See also ==
- Kalsbeek College
- List of schools in the Netherlands
