= Kalsbeek College =

Coordinates: 52.0917°N 4.8704°E

Location
- Jozef Israëlslaan and Van kempensingel Woerden; Netherlands

Information
- Type: High school
- Director: C.H. Coebrugge (Schilderspark); P. Verkade (Bredius)
- Gender: Coeducational
- Age: 12 to 18
- Website: http://www.kalsbeek.nl/

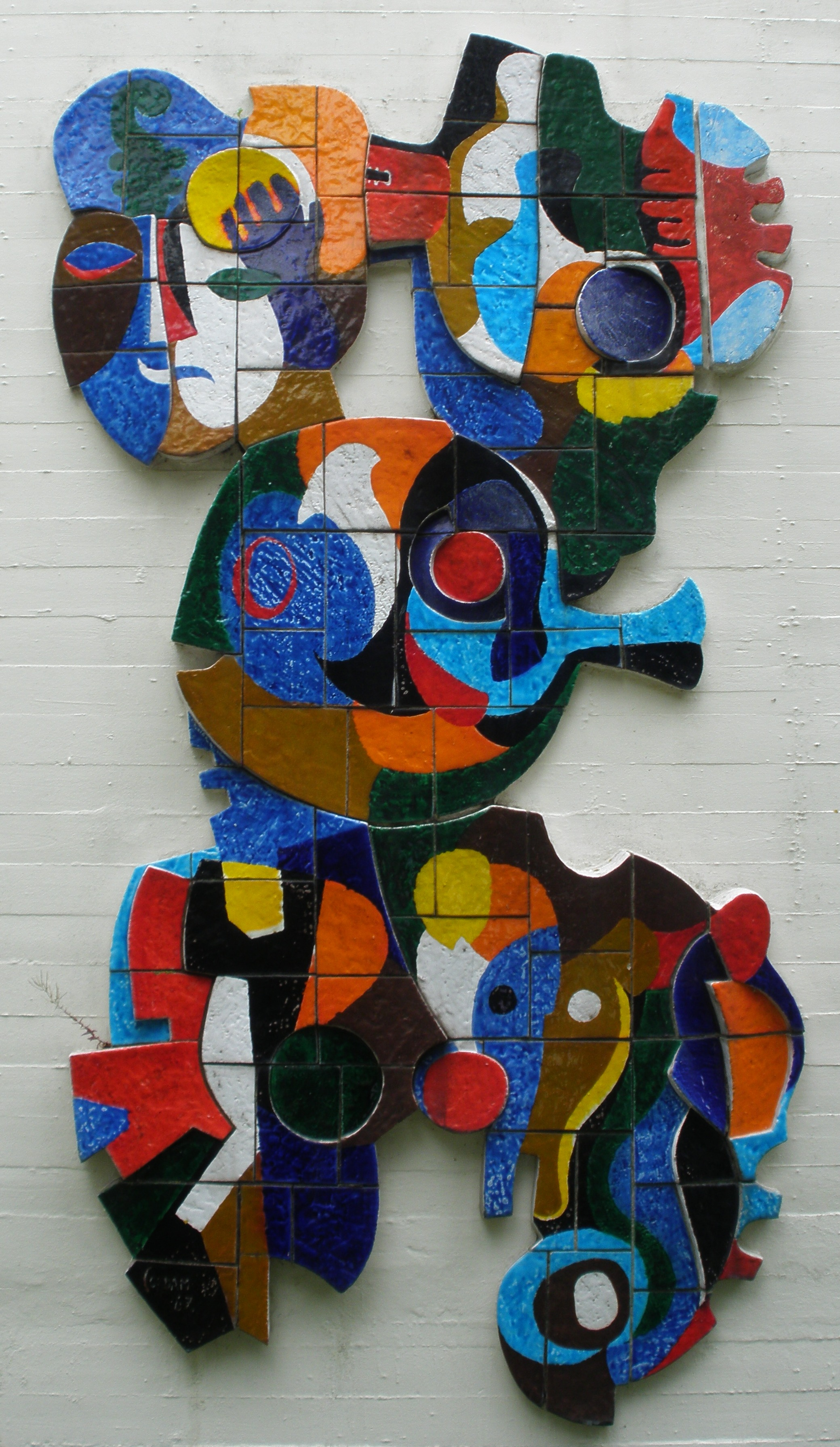
A work of art (Cor van Dam, 1976) on the wall of location Schilderspark

Kalsbeek College is a secondary school in the village of Woerden, Netherlands. The school is split between two sites and teaches all forms of Dutch secondary education. The Schilderspark site is on Jozef Israëlslaan and the Bredius site on Van kempensingel. The school has won the 538 Schoolawards in 2012, an election by the Dutch radio station Radio 538.

== See also ==
- Minkema College
- List of schools in the Netherlands
