= Johannes Rhodius =

Danish physician (1587–1659

- Hinne Rode
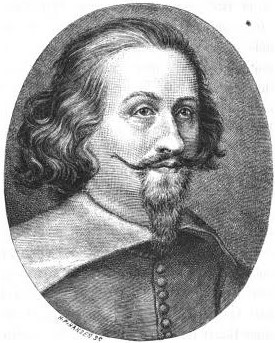
- Born: 1587; Copenhagen
- Died: February 24, 1659; Padua
- Scientific career
- Fields: Medicine

Johannes Rhodius (born 1587 in Copenhagen, died February 24, 1659 in Padua, Latinized form of Hinne Rode) was a Danish physician who worked mainly in Italy (distinct from 16th century Dutch humanist Hinne Rode).

== Early life ==
Johannes Rhodius was a son of the merchant and shipowner Helmer Rode. As a young man he attended the Herlufsholm School, in Næstved.

Around 1607 he traveled to England and Scotland. In London he met poet-doctor Raphael Thorius. He spent academic year 1610/1611 at University of Copenhagen. Here he became friends with physician, historian, and antiquary Ole Worm, who remained a correspondent throughout his life. From the winter semester of 1611/12 he was enrolled at the University of Wittenberg. In February 1612 he was a respondent to a disputation by the German educationalist Sigismund Evenius. In 1614 he went to the University of Marburg, in 1616 to the University of Giessen, in 1618 to the University of Basel and in 1619 to Heidelberg University. From 1620 to 1622 he practiced as a doctor in Copenhagen.

In 1622 he went to the University of Padua and received his doctorate in medicine.

== Career ==
In 1625 he worked for a short time in Siena. After that he returned to Padua for good. After surviving the plague that raged in 1630 and closed the university for two years, he was offered a professorship in botany in 1632, combined with the management of Orto botanico di Padova, which he declined.

Rhodius's house in Padua became a magnet for Danish and other foreign students. He maintained a pan-European network of friends and correspondents. 28 letters between him and Jesuit scholar and polymath Athanasius Kircher survive.

Advised by French librarian and scholar Gabriel Naudé, and benefiting from his proximity to the printing and book metropolis of Venice, he built a significant private library. In 1631 he developed a plan to build a public library in Padua.

Rhodius wrote a guide to studying medicine, with detailed bibliographical references, which were initially printed locally and were made known to a wider readership only after his death by medical scholars Thomas Bartholin and Hermann Conring.

In his writings on the history of medicine, he made the work of ancient Roman physicians Aulus Cornelius Celsus and Scribonius Largus accessible to the students of his time with an explanatory commentary.

Rode never married. He died on February 24, 1659, and was buried in the church of San Francesco Grande, Padua.

== Library ==
Rhodius's private library was inherited by his nephew, the Copenhagen professor Thomas Bang (1600–1661). After Bang's death, it was auctioned to the highest bidder in 1662.

Rhodius's written manuscripts were mainly given to Thomas Bartholin. He was able to publish some of them; however, a large part, including Rode's edition of De medicina of Celsus, were destroyed in a fire in Bartholin's library in 1670.

The archaeological antiquities he collected in Italy were acquired by the physician Thomas Fuiren (1616–1674) for his cabinet of curiosities; through his testamentary donation they were given to the University of Copenhagen, which later exhibited them for some time.

Rhodius's Album amicorum is preserved in the Royal Library, Denmark, as are draft letters and two manuscripts.

== Works ==
- De Modestia Et Magnanimitate. Wittenberg: Henckel 1612 (Digitalisat)
- Scribonii Largi Compositiones Medicae. Padua 1635
- De acia dissertatio ad Cornelii Celsi mentem. 1639
- Observationum Medicinalium Centuriae Tres. 1657

Neuauflage posthum Frankfurt 1676

- (posthum) Mantissa anatomica ad Thomam Bartholinum. Kopenhagen 1661
- (posthum), Vincent Placcius (Hrsg.): Joannis Rhodii Dani Auctorum Supposititiorum Catalogus: Ad autographum Eiusdem fideliter expressus, in quo Scriptores Anonymi & Pseudonymi Complures manifestantur / Opusculum Posthumum ex Musaeo Vincentii Placii, I.U.L. Hamburgensis. Cuius etiam Notae sparsim adiectae sunt. Hamburg 1674
