= Railroad switch =

Mechanism to transfer rail vehicles from one track to another

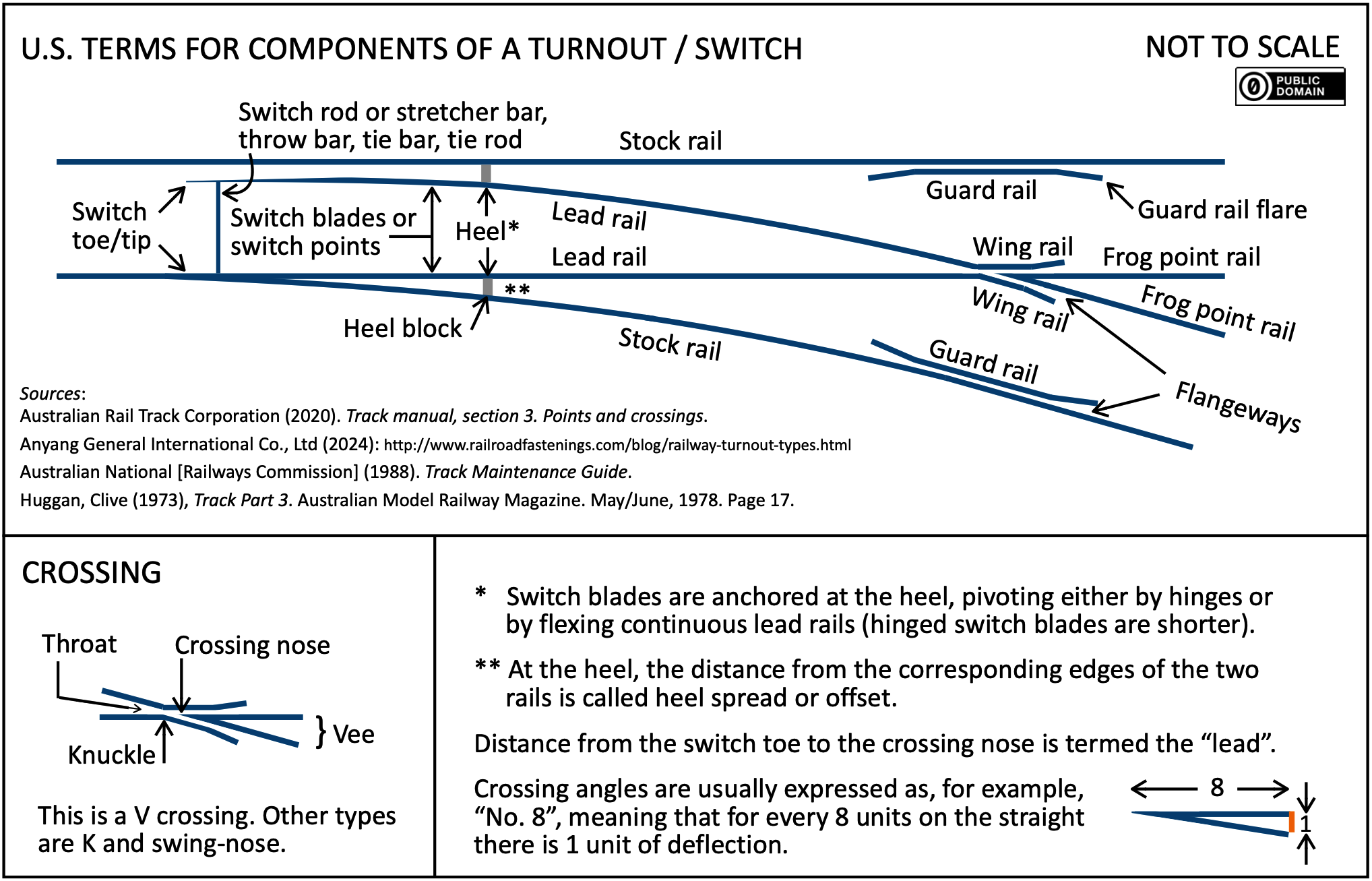
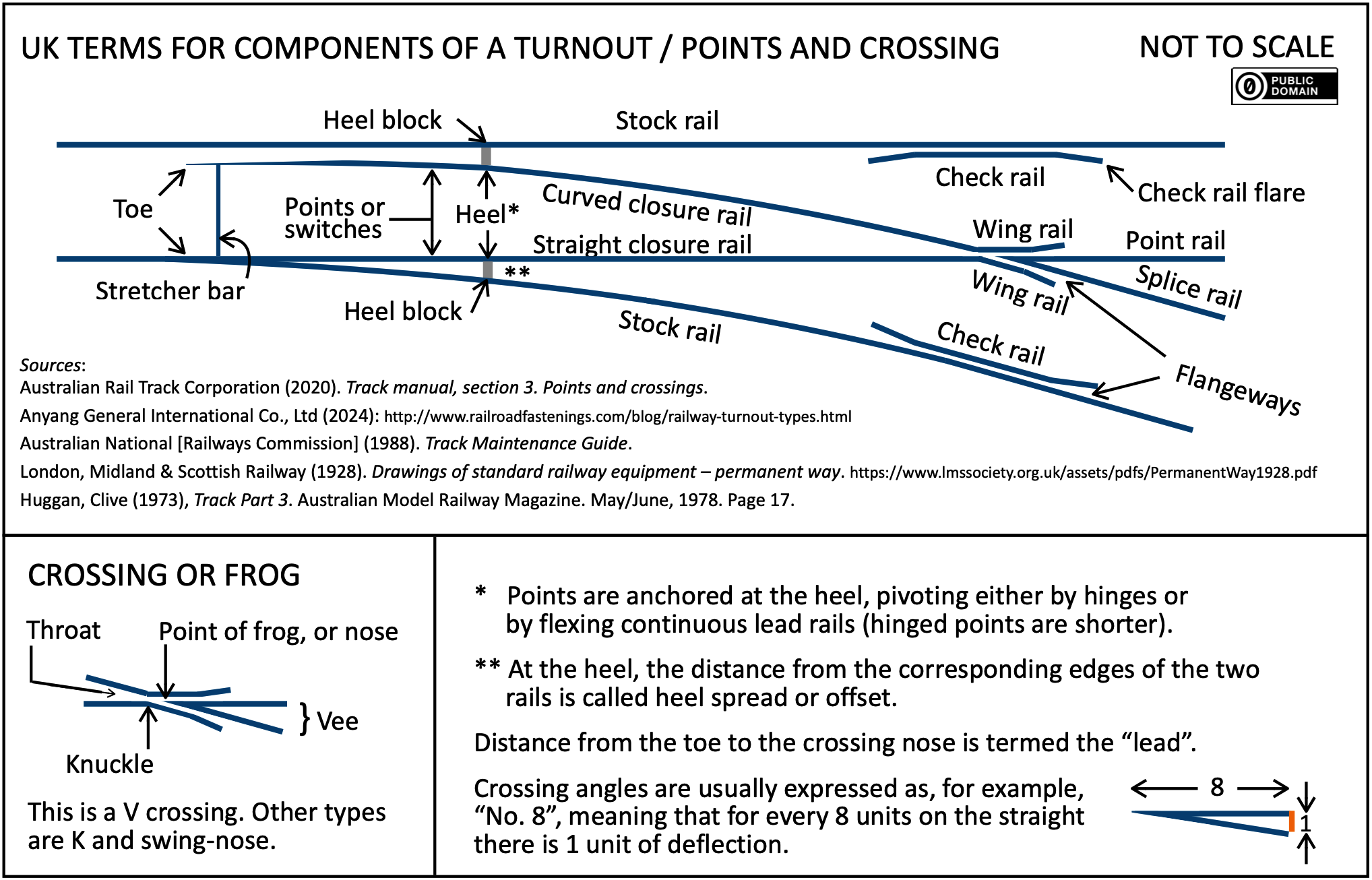

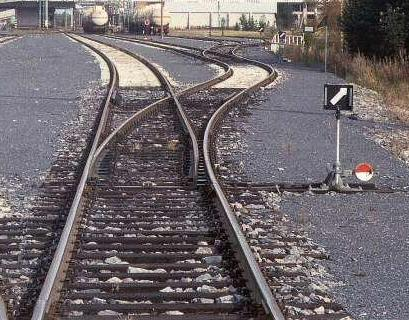
A right-hand railroad switch with point indicator pointing to right

Animated diagram of a right-hand railroad switch. The green line represents direction of travel only, the black lines represent fixed portions of track, and the red lines depict the moving components. Track A divides into two: the straight track (B), named the normal, and the diverging track (C), named the reverse.

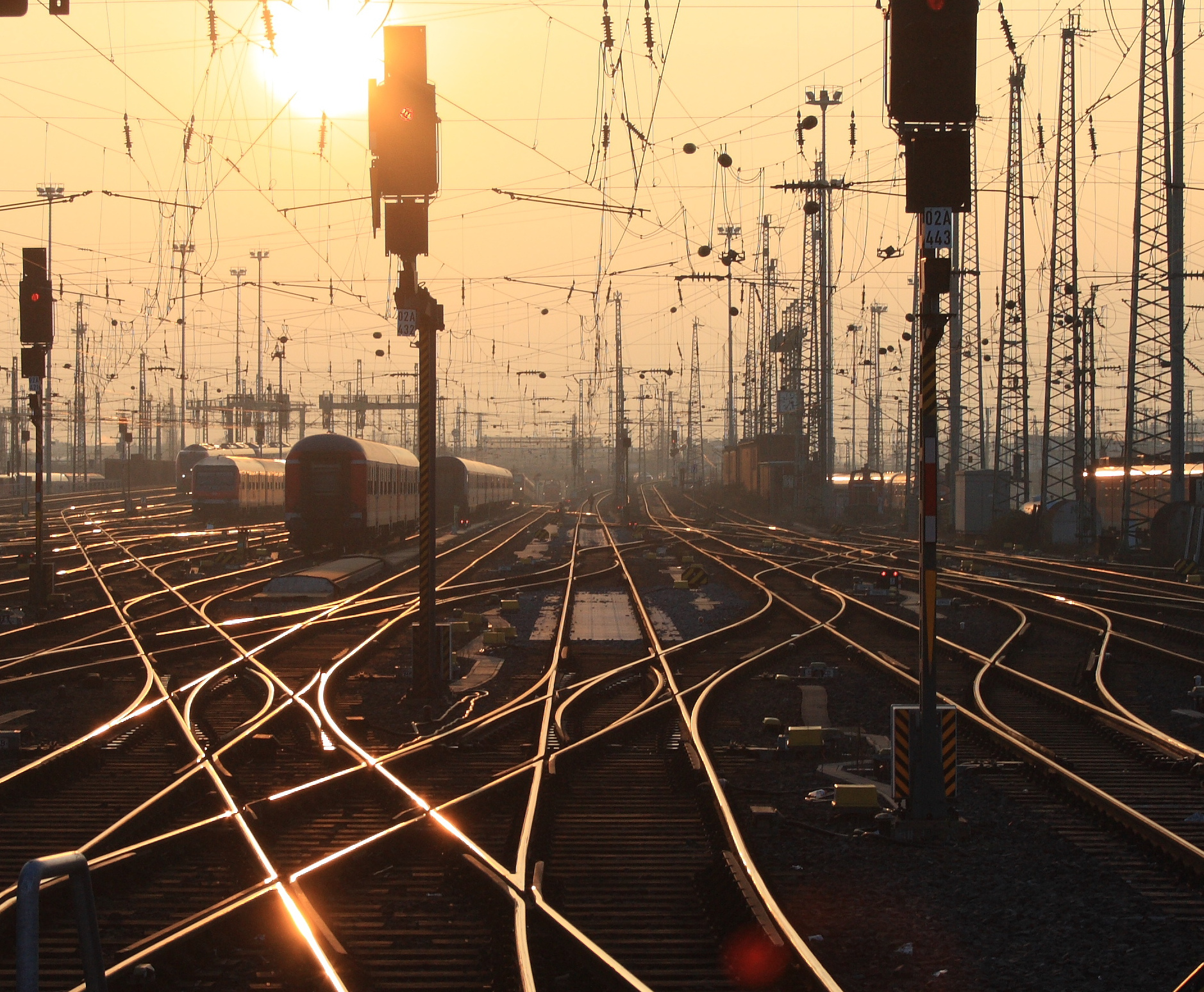
Large stations may have hundreds of switches (Frankfurt Central Station, Germany).

Switch blades in motion (Hong Kong Mass Transit Railway light rail)

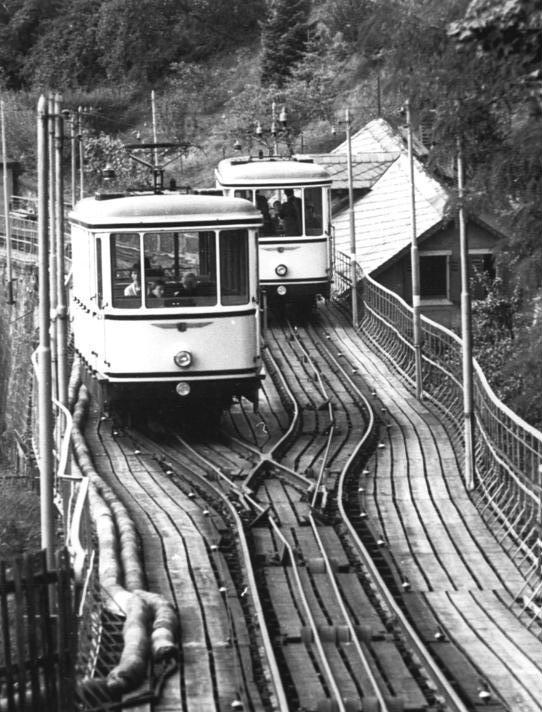
Abt switch used in the 1895-built Dresden Funicular Railway (photo of 1985)

A railroad switch (AE), turnout, or (set of) points (CE) is a mechanical installation enabling railway trains to be guided from one track to another, such as at a railway junction or where a spur or siding branches off.

== Design ==
The parts of a turnout are known by different names in different jurisdictions. The main terms in US and UK usage are shown in the selectable diagrams. In this article, the US term is listed first and UK second, in parentheses.

The most common type of switch consists of a pair of linked tapering rails, known as points (switch rails or point blades), lying between the diverging outer rails (the stock rails). These points can be moved laterally into one of two positions to direct a train coming from the point blades toward the straight path or the diverging path. A train moving from the narrow end toward the point blades (i.e. it will be directed to one of the two paths, depending on the position of the points) is said to be executing a facing-point movement.

For many types of switch, a train coming from either of the converging directions will pass through the switch regardless of the position of the points, as the vehicle's wheels will force the points to move. Passage through a switch in this direction is known as a trailing-point movement and switches that allow this type of movement without damage to the mechanism are called trailable switches. In turn, these can either be non-resettable or resettable, meaning they either require on-site intervention to return the switch to operation after a trailing point movement or can continue operating with no in-person actions.

A switch generally has a straight "through" track, such as the mainline, and a diverging route – respectively termed "normal" and "reverse" routes. The handedness of the installation is described by the side that the diverging track leaves. Right-hand switches have a diverging path to the right of the straight track, when coming from the point blades (switch blades), and a left-handed switch has the diverging track leaving to the opposite side. In many cases, such as rail yards, many switches can be found in a short section of track, sometimes with switches going both to the right and left (although it is better to keep these separated as much as feasible). Sometimes a switch merely divides one track into two; at others, it serves as a connection between two or more parallel tracks, allowing a train to switch between them. In many cases, where a switch is supplied to leave a track, a second is supplied to allow the train to reenter the track some distance down the line; this allows the track to serve as a siding, allowing a train to get off the track to allow traffic to pass (this siding can either be a dedicated short length of track, or formed from a section of a second, continuous, parallel line), and also allows trains coming from either direction to switch between lines; otherwise, the only way for a train coming from the opposite direction to use a switch would be to stop, and reverse through the switch onto the other line, and then continue forwards (or stop, if it is being used as a siding).

A straight track is not always present; for example, both tracks may curve, one to the left and one to the right (such as for a wye switch), or both tracks may curve, with differing radii, while still in the same direction. Switches consume a relatively high proportion of a railway maintenance budget.

== History ==
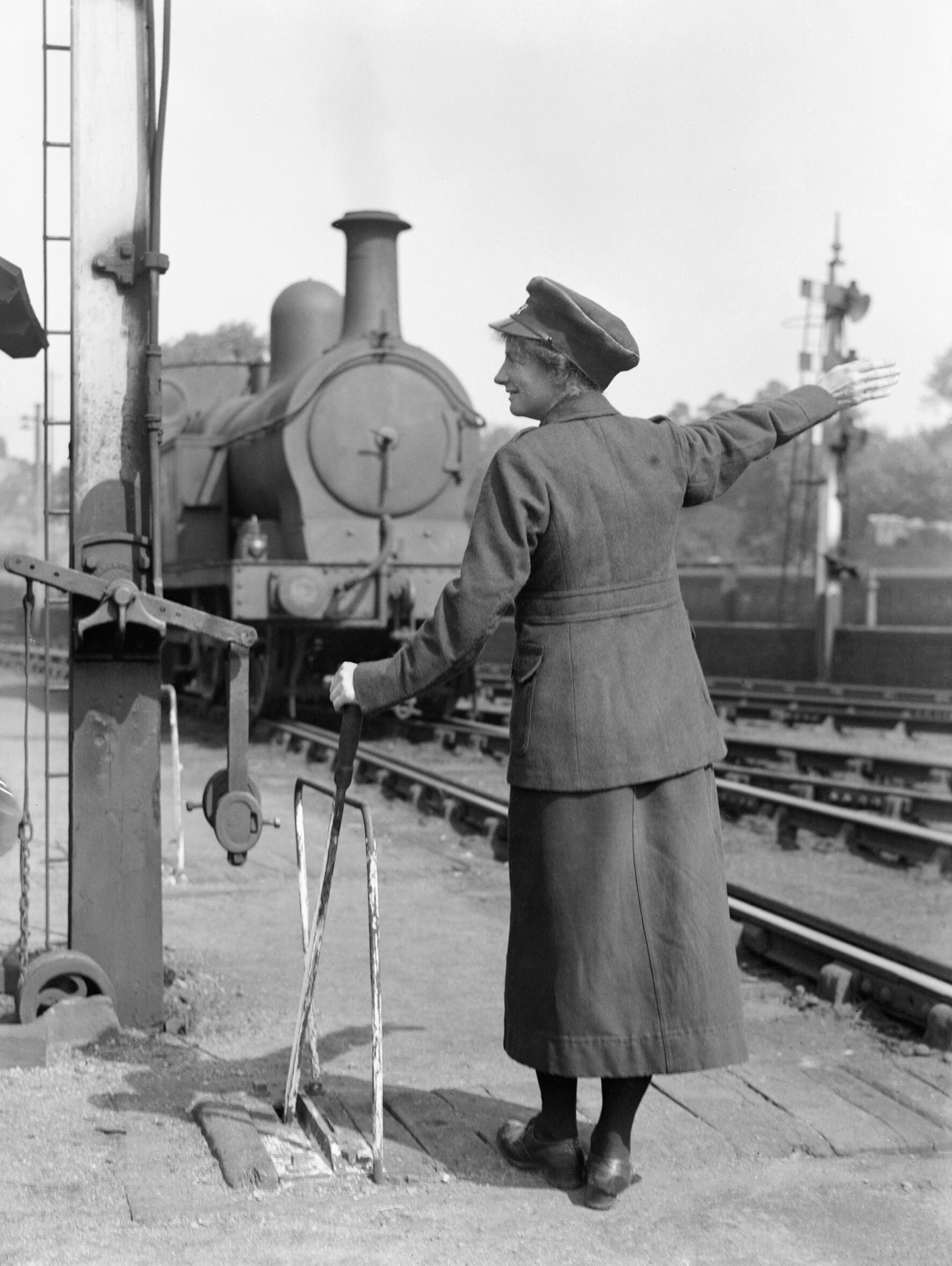
A railway worker operating a manual switch at a rail yard in Britain during World War I

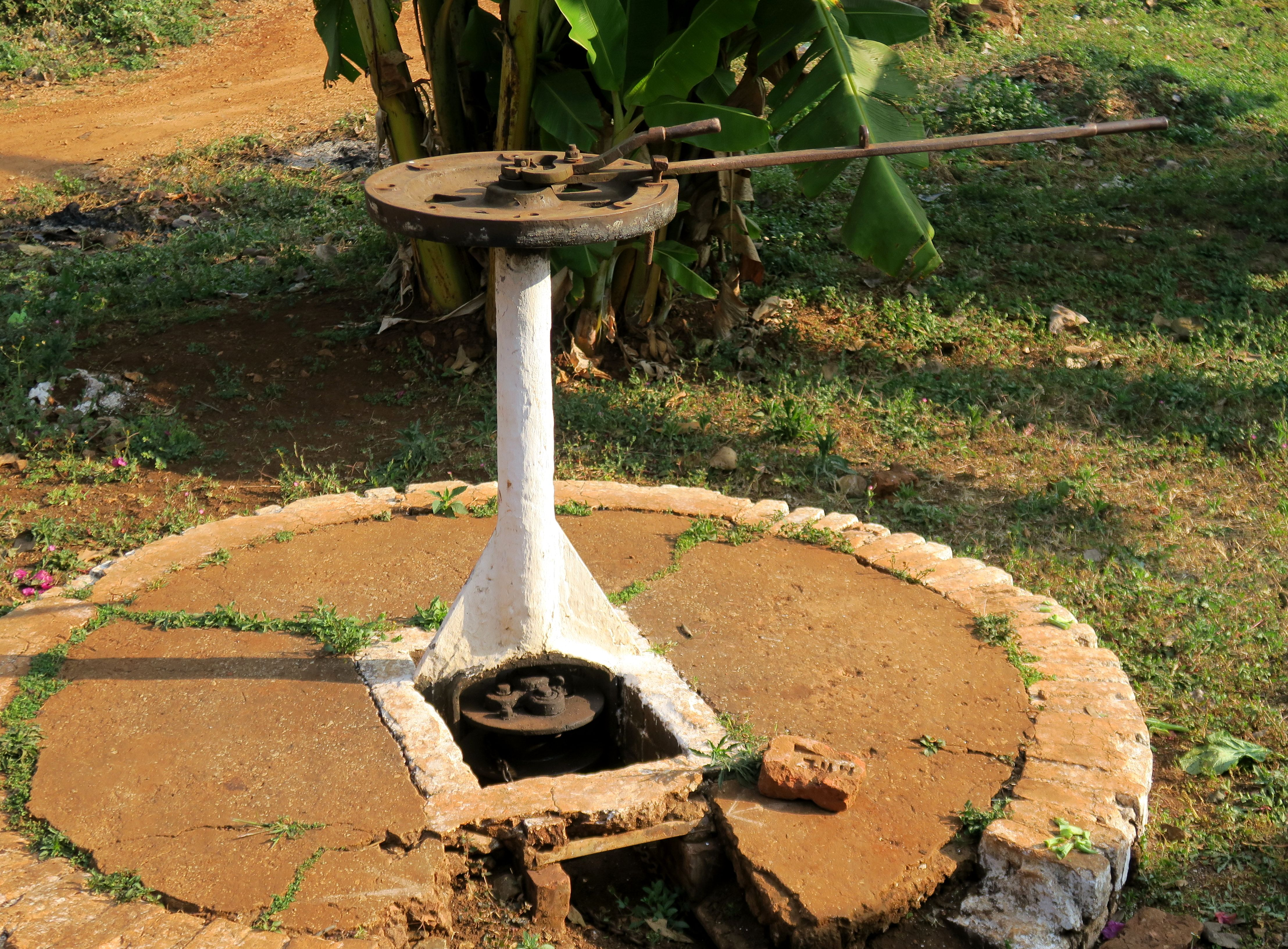
Control stand of a defunct railroad switch on the way from Pyin Oo Lwin to Goteik viaduct (Myanmar)

Simple single-bladed switches were used on early wooden railways to move wagons between tracks. As iron-railed plateways became more common in the eighteenth century, cast iron components were made to build switches with check rails. In 1797, John Curr described the system that he developed which used a single iron blade, hinged on a vertical pin that was tapered to lie against the plateway. By 1808, Curr's basic design was in common use.

The use of a sprung rail, giving a smooth transition, was patented by Charles Fox in 1838.

Prior to the widespread availability of electricity, switches at heavily traveled junctions were operated from a signal box constructed near the tracks through an elaborate system of rods and levers. The levers were also used to control railway signals to control the movement of trains over the points. Eventually, mechanical systems known as interlockings were introduced to make sure that a signal could only be set to allow a train to proceed over points when it was safe to do so. Purely mechanical interlockings were eventually developed into integrated systems with electric control. On some low-traffic branch lines, in self-contained marshalling yards, or on heritage railways, switches may still have the earlier type of interlocking.

== Operation ==
The operation of a railroad switch. In this animation, the red track is the one traveled during a facing-point movement. The switch mechanism, shown in black, may be operated remotely using an electric motor or hand-operated lever or from a nearby ground frame.

A railroad car's wheels normally take up a position over the center of the rails by virtue of the wheel treads' coning; the flanges on the inside edges of the wheels. When the wheels reach the switch, the wheels are guided along the route determined by which of the two points is connected to the track facing the switch. In the illustration, if the left point is connected, the left wheel will be guided along the rail of that point, and the train will diverge to the right. If the right point is connected, the right wheel will be guided along the rail of that point, and the train will continue along the straight track. Only one of the points may be connected to the facing track at any time; the two points are mechanically locked together to ensure that this is always the case.

A mechanism is provided to move the points from one position to the other ("changing the switch-blades" or "changing the points"). Historically, this would require a lever to be moved by a human operator, and some switches are still controlled this way. However, most are now operated by a remotely controlled actuator called a switch machine or point machine, which may contain an electric motor or a pneumatic or hydraulic actuator. This both allows remote control and monitoring, and the use of stiffer, strong switches that would be too difficult to move by hand.

In a trailing-point movement (running through the switch in the wrong direction while they are set to turn off the track), the flanges on the wheels will force the points to the proper position. This is sometimes known as running through the switch. Some switches are designed to be forced to the proper position without damage. Examples include variable switches, spring switches, and weighted switches.

If the points are rigidly connected to the switch control mechanism, the control mechanism's linkages may be bent, requiring repair before the switch is again usable. For this reason, switches are normally set to the proper position before performing a trailing-point movement.

=== High-speed operation ===
Generally, switches are designed to be safely traversed at low speed. However, it is possible to modify the simpler types of switch to allow trains to pass at high speed. More complicated switch systems, such as double slips, are restricted to low-speed operation. On European high-speed lines, it is not uncommon to find switches where a speed of 200 km/h (124 mph) or more is allowed on the diverging branch. Switches were passed over at a speed of 560 km/h (348 mph) (straight) during the French world speed run of April 2007.

The US Federal Railroad Administration has published the speed limits for higher-speed turnouts with No. 26.5 turnout that has speed limit of 60 mph (97 km/h) and No. 32.7 with speed limit of 80 mph (129 km/h).

=== Operation in cold conditions ===
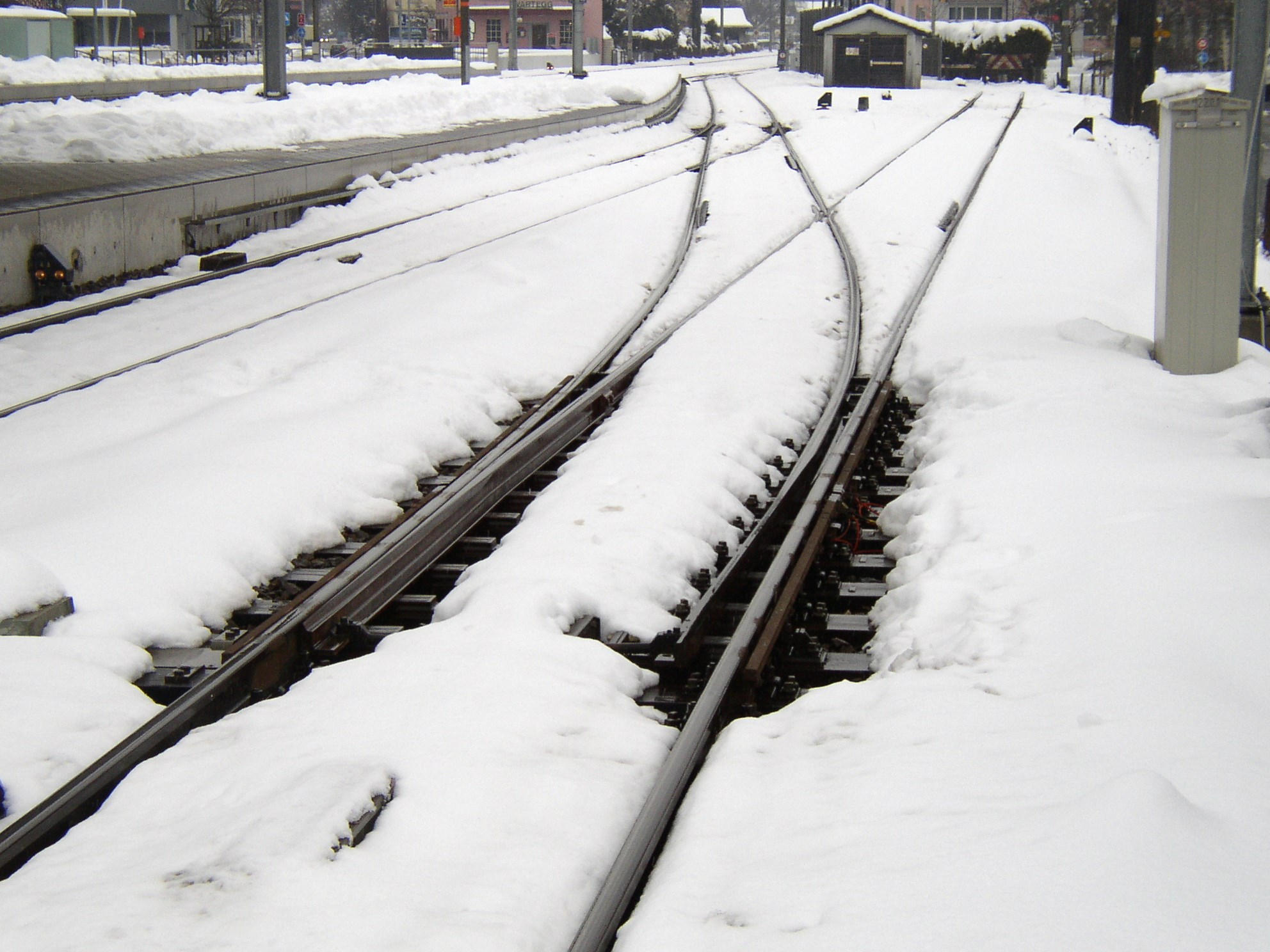
Gas heating keeps a switch free from snow and ice.

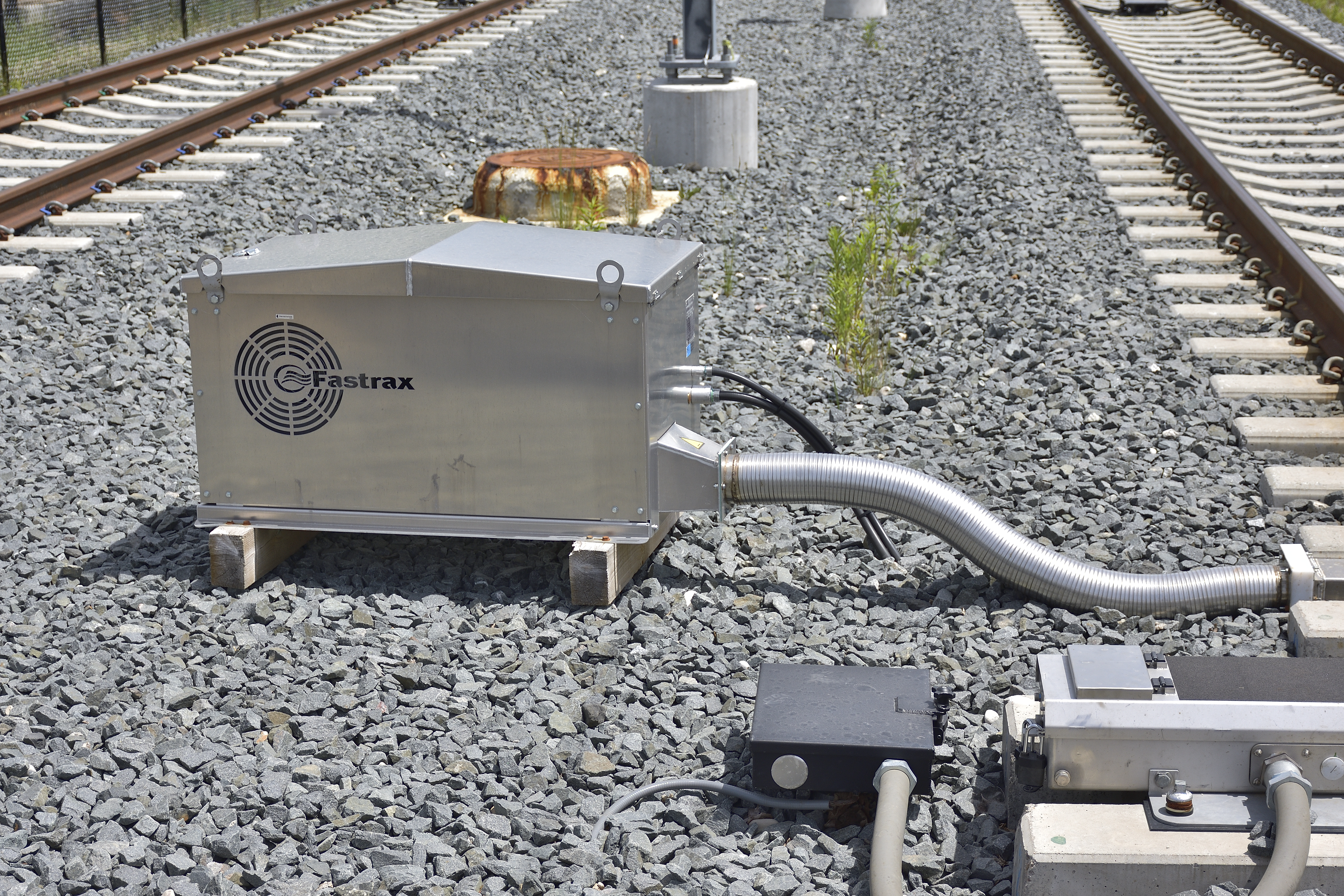
Similarly, an electric forced-air heater can keep a switch free from snow and ice.

Under cold weather conditions, snow and ice can prevent the proper movement of switch or frog point rails, essentially inhibiting the proper operation of railroad switches. Heating alone may not always be enough to keep switches functioning under snowy conditions. Wet snow conditions, which generate particularly sticky snow and whiteout conditions, may occur at temperatures just below freezing, causing chunks of ice to accumulate on trains. When trains traverse over some switches, the shock, vibration, possibly in combination with slight heating caused by braking or a city microclimate, may cause the chunks of ice to fall off, jamming the switches. The heaters need time to melt the ice, so if service frequency is extremely high, there may not be enough time for the ice to melt before the next train arrives, which will then result in service disruptions. Possible solutions include installing higher capacity heaters, reducing the frequency of trains, or applying anti-icing chemicals such as ethylene glycol to the trains.

== Classification ==
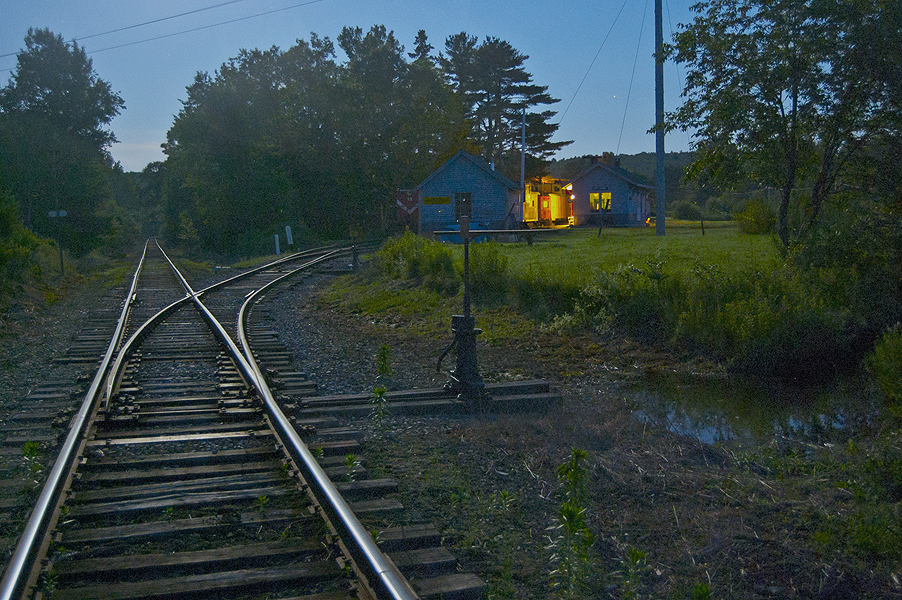
A low-speed No. 6 right-hand switch between a main line and a rail yard

The divergence and length of a switch is determined by the angle of the frog (the point in the switch where two rails cross, see below) and the angle or curvature of the switch blades. The length and placement of the other components are determined from this using established formulas and standards. This divergence is measured as the number of units of length for a single unit of separation.

In North America this is generally referred to as a switch's "number". For example, on a "number 12" switch, the rails are one unit apart at a distance of twelve units from the center of the frog.

In the United Kingdom points and crossings using chaired bullhead rail would be referred to using a letter and number combination. The letter would define the length (and hence the radius) of the switch blades and the number would define the angle of the crossing (frog). Thus an A7 turnout would be very short and likely only to be found in tight places like dockyards whereas an E12 would be found as a fairly high speed turnout on a mainline.

On the London, Midland and Scottish Railway, switch curvatures were specified from A (sharpest) to F (shallowest), with the following corresponding radii:

- B – 613 feet (187 m) – simple crossover with a 1 in 8 crossing angle
- C – 980 feet (299 m) – scissors or simple crossover with a 1 in 10 crossing angle
- D – 1,379 feet (420 m) – double track junction switch with a 1 in 12 crossing angle

== Safety ==
Switches are necessary for the operation of a railway, but they pose a number of risks:

- Reversing the points under a moving train will almost always derail the train.
- Points might move due to the extreme forces exerted by a passing train. In an especially noteworthy and extreme case, a switch's setting was forcibly changed as a result of a disintegrated duo-block wheel getting caught in a switch. This caused one of the world's worst rail disasters, the Eschede train disaster.
- A train might stand so close to the frog of a switch that a passing train would collide with its side (the first train is then said to have been fouling the switch).
- The necessary maintenance of the complex mechanical device might be neglected.
- Tampering with a manually operable switch or operation errors in an interlocking may result in two trains being on the same track, potentially causing a collision.

=== Accidents ===
Switch-related accidents caused by one or more of these risks have occurred, including:

- The 1980 Buttevant Rail Disaster at Buttevant, County Cork, in Ireland, when the Dublin–Cork express was derailed at high speed after being inadvertently switched into a siding via ground frame operated points, resulting in 18 deaths.
- Wrecks caused by switches being thrown open in front of the trains by saboteurs, as in the non-fatal derailments near Newport News, on 12 August 1992, and in Stewiacke, on 12 April 2001. To prevent these incidents, most unused switches are locked.
- The Eschede train disaster in 1998 in Germany was one of the world's deadliest high-speed train accidents, resulting in 101 deaths. It occurred when a wheel rim of an ICE train failed at 200 kilometers per hour (120 mph), partially derailing the car. The wheel rim went through the floor of the carriage and was dragging on the ground. While passing through the station at Eschede it threw a switch, causing the rear wheels of the car to switch onto a track diverging from the track taken by the front wheels. The car was thereby thrown into and destroyed the piers supporting a 300-tonne roadway overpass.
- The May 2002 Potters Bar rail crash at Potters Bar, Hertfordshire, in the United Kingdom, occurred when a switch sprang to a different position as a coach crossed it, a type of mishap called splitting the switch. The front wheels of a coach progressed along the straight track as intended, but the rear wheels slewed along the diverging track. This caused the whole coach to detach from the train and slew sideways across the platform ahead. The movement of the switch occurred beneath the final coach, so that the preceding coaches remained on the track. Poor maintenance of the points was found to be the primary cause of the crash.
- The interim report into the Grayrigg derailment of 23 February 2007 blamed an incorrectly maintained set of points.
  - On 31 July 1991, several cars derailed, killing seven passengers, due to a missing locking pin on the switch mechanism.
  - Twenty-seven years later, on 4 February 2018, the Silver Star crashed into a parked freight train on a siding due to a misaligned switch, killing two crewmen.
- The 2020 Livraga derailment in Italy (2 deaths) was caused by a manufacturing defect in the switch actuator, which resulted in inverted behavior (i.e. diverted when commanded to be straight), and by failure to detect the fault after installation on the line.

== Components ==
=== Switch rails (points or point blades) ===
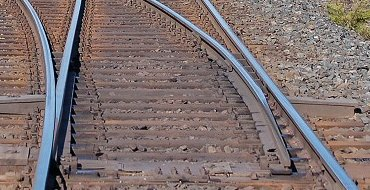
A pair of tapered moveable rails known as switch rails (points or point blades)

Switch rails (points or point blades) are the movable rails that guide the wheels towards either the straight or the diverging track. They are tapered, except on stub switches occasionally found in industrial sidings, which have square ends.

In popular parlance in the UK and most other Commonwealth countries, the term points refers to the entire mechanism. In professional parlance, the term refers only to the movable rails and the entire mechanism is named turnout or points and crossings. Turnout and switch are terms used in North America in all contexts.

In some cases, the switch blades can be heat treated for improvement of their service life. There are different kinds of heat treatment processes such as edge hardening or complete hardening.

The cross-section of the switch blades also influences performance. New tangential blades perform better than old-style blades.

=== Crossing (frog) ===
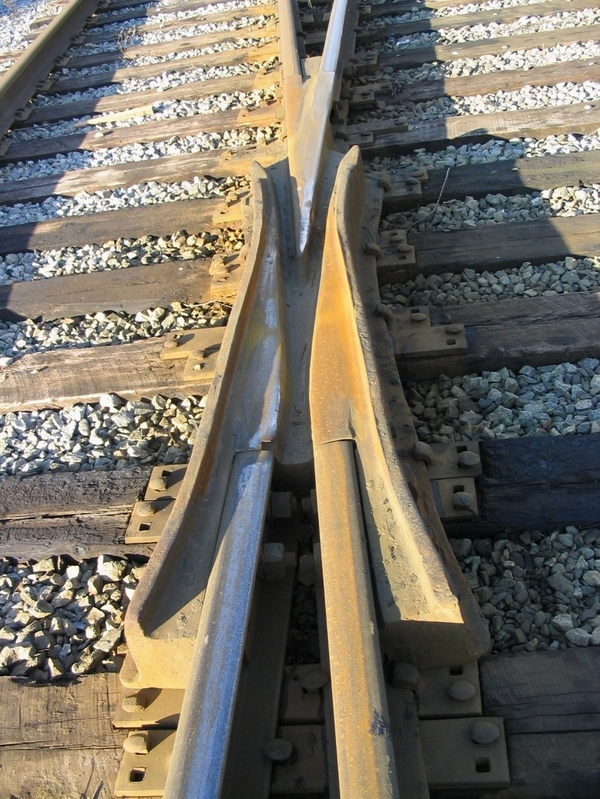
A one-piece cast crossing. The shiny line crosses the rusty line. This North American "self-guarding cast manganese" component without guard rails has raised flanges on the crossing, which may bear on the face of the wheel as it passes through.

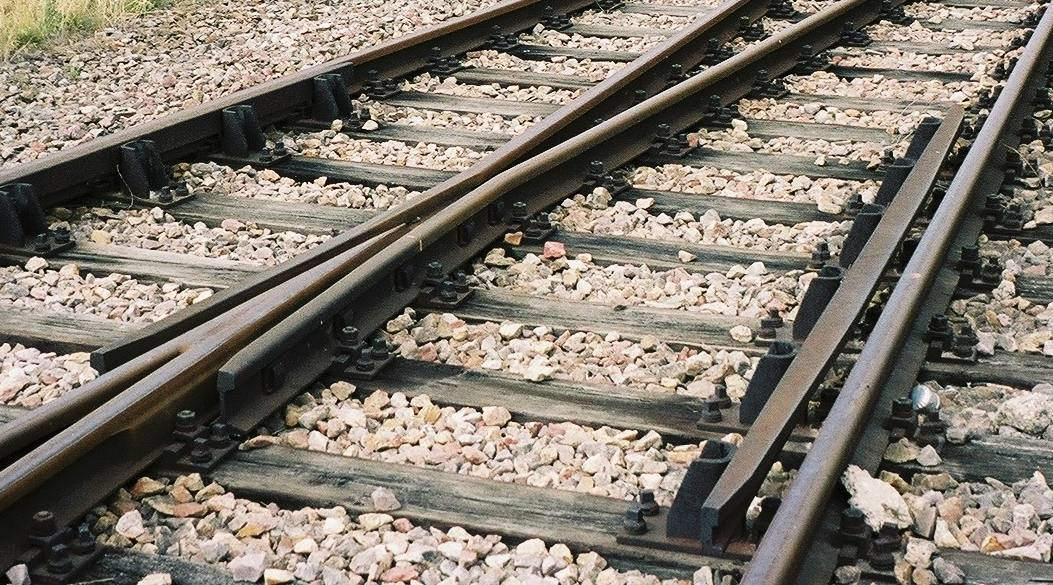
Left, the crossing or frog with its adjacent wing rails; right, the guard rail or check rail

The crossing or frog is the component that enables passage of wheels on either route through the turnout. It can be assembled out of several appropriately cut and bent pieces of rail or can be a single casting of manganese steel. On lines with heavy use, the casting may be treated with explosive shock hardening to increase service life.

=== Guard rail (check rail) ===
A guard rail is a short piece of rail placed alongside the main (stock) rail opposite the crossing. These ensure that the wheels follow the appropriate flangeway through the frog and that the train does not derail.

Check rails are often used on very sharp curves, even where there are no switches.

=== Switch motor ===
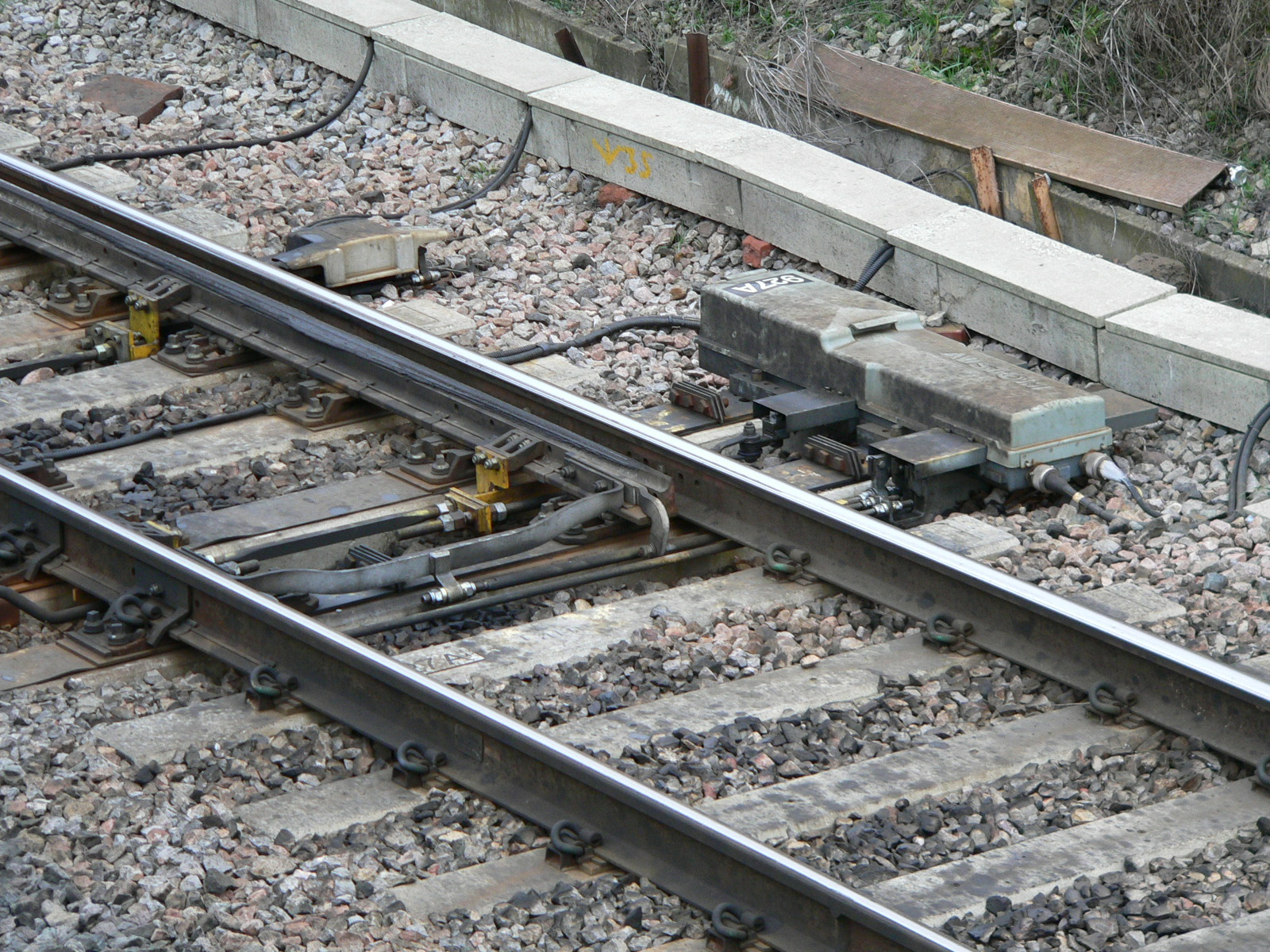
The switch motor (in this case an electric motor) and associated mechanism used to operate this switch can be seen to the right in the picture.

A switch motor or switch machine (point motor or point machine) is an electric, hydraulic or pneumatic mechanism that aligns the points with one of the possible routes. The motor is usually controlled remotely by the dispatcher (signaller in the UK). The switch motor also includes electrical contacts to detect that the switch has completely set and locked. If the switch fails to do this, the governing signal is kept at red (stop). There is also usually some kind of manual handle for operating the switch in emergencies, such as power failures, or for maintenance purposes.

A patent by W. B. Purvis dates from 1897.

=== Switch stand (points lever) ===
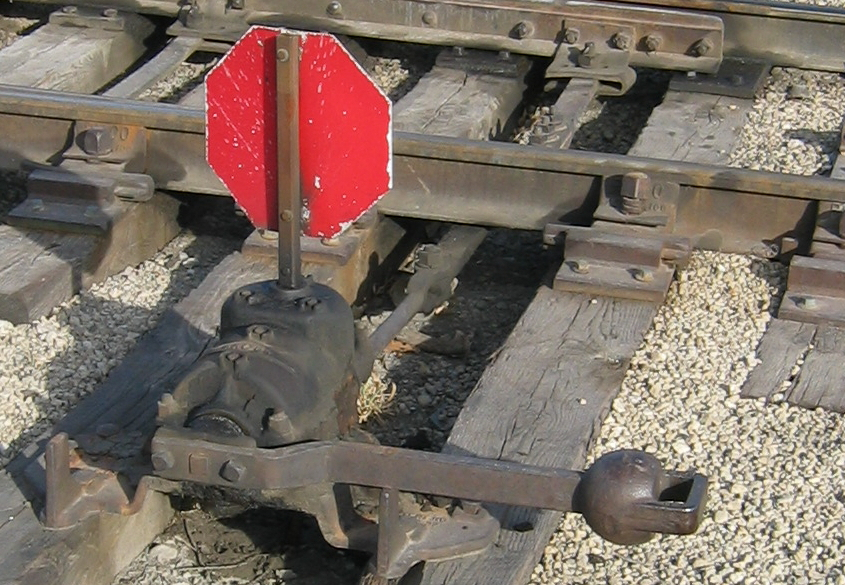
An example of a mechanism used at a switch. The two points are linked together with a throw bar (also known as a stretcher bar). The throw bar extends to the lever on the near side of the track, which is used to throw the switch. This is an example of a low switch stand, used at locations where there is not sufficient clearance for a tall switch stand. This particular stand is designed to be trailed through by rolling stock, which will cause the points to become lined for the route that the wheels have passed through. It has a reflectorized target.

A switch stand (points lever or ground throw) is a lever and accompanying linkages to align the points of a switch by hand. The lever and its accompanying hardware is usually mounted to a pair of long ties (sleepers) that extend from the switch at the points. They are often used in a place of a switch motor on less frequently used switches. In some places, the lever may be some distance from the points, as part of a lever frame or ground frame. To prevent the tampering of switches by outside means, these switches are locked when not in use.

=== Facing point lock ===
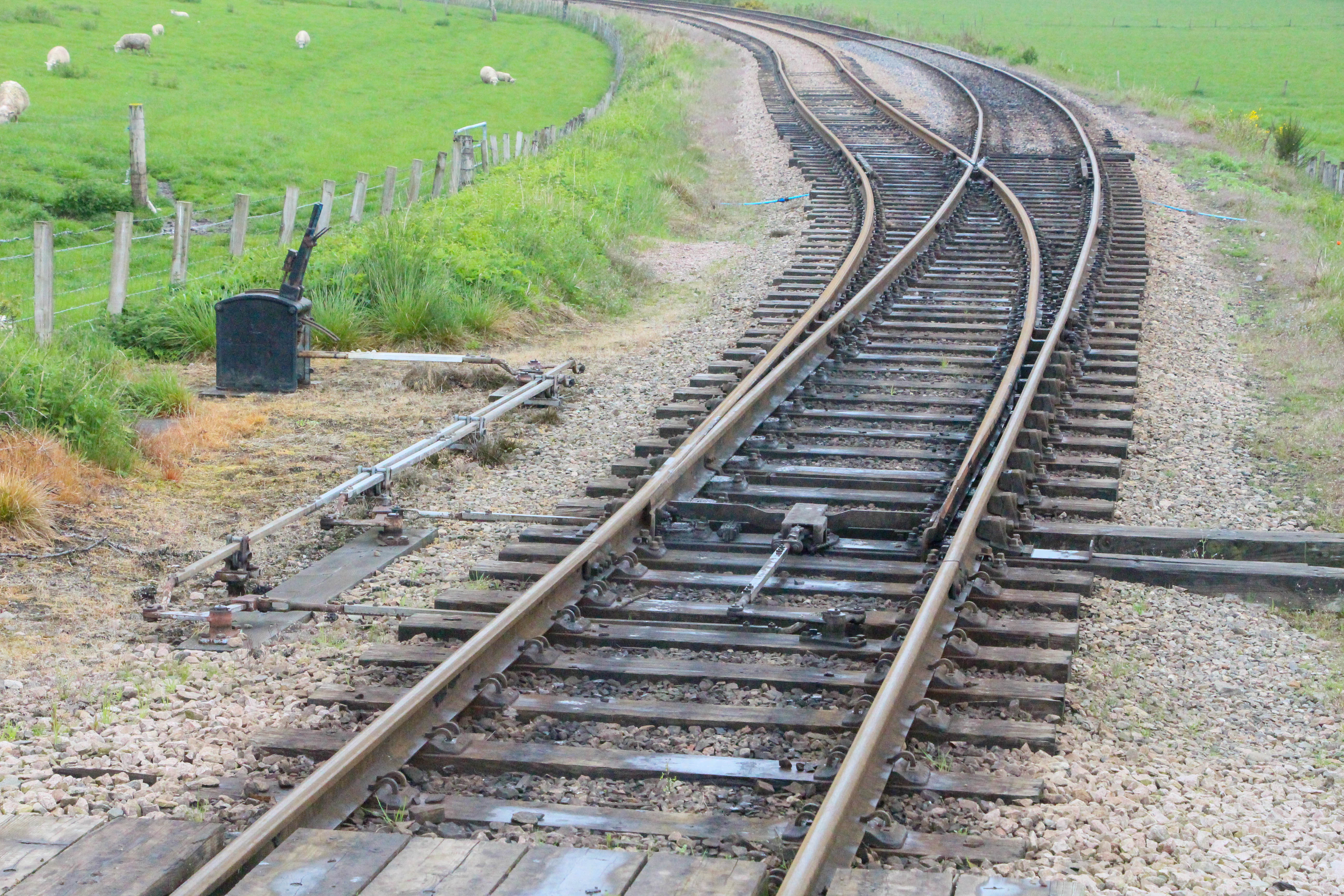
A set of points on the Strathspey Railway in Scotland. The facing point lock in the middle will need to be withdrawn using the blue lever (behind) on the left before the points themselves can be moved using the black lever (front). Once the points have been moved the lock will be pushed in again with the blue lever to lock the points in position.

A facing point lock (FPL), or point lock, is a device which, as the name implies, locks a set of points in position, as well as mechanically proving that they are in the correct position. The facing point part of the name refers to the fact that they prevent movement of the points during facing moves, where a train could potentially split the points (end up going down both tracks) if the points were to move underneath the train. During trailing moves, the wheels of a train will force the points into the correct position if they attempt to move, although this may cause considerable damage. This act is known as a "run through".

In the United Kingdom, FPLs were common from an early date, due to laws being passed which forced the provision of FPLs for any routes traveled by passenger trains – it was, and still is, illegal for a passenger train to make a facing move over points without them being locked, either by a point lock, or temporarily clamped in one position or another.

=== Joints ===
Joints are used where the moving points meet the fixed rails of the switch. They allow the points to hinge easily between their positions. Originally the movable switch blades were connected to the fixed closure rails with loose joints, but since steel is somewhat flexible it is possible to obviate this looseness by thinning a short section of the rail's bottom itself.

=== Straight and curved switches ===
Turnouts were originally built with straight switch blades, which ended at the pointed end with a sharp angle. These switches cause a bump when the train traverses in the turnout direction. The switch blades could be made with a curved point which meets the stockrail at a tangent, causing less of a bump, but the disadvantage is that the metal at the point is thin and necessarily weak. A solution to these conflicting requirements was found in the 1920s on the German Reichsbahn. The first step was to have different rail profile for the stock rails and switch rails, with the switch rails being about 25 mm (0.98 in) less high, and stockier in the middle.

== Types ==
Apart from the standard right-hand and left-hand switches, switches commonly come in various combinations of configurations.

=== Slip ===
==== Double slip ====
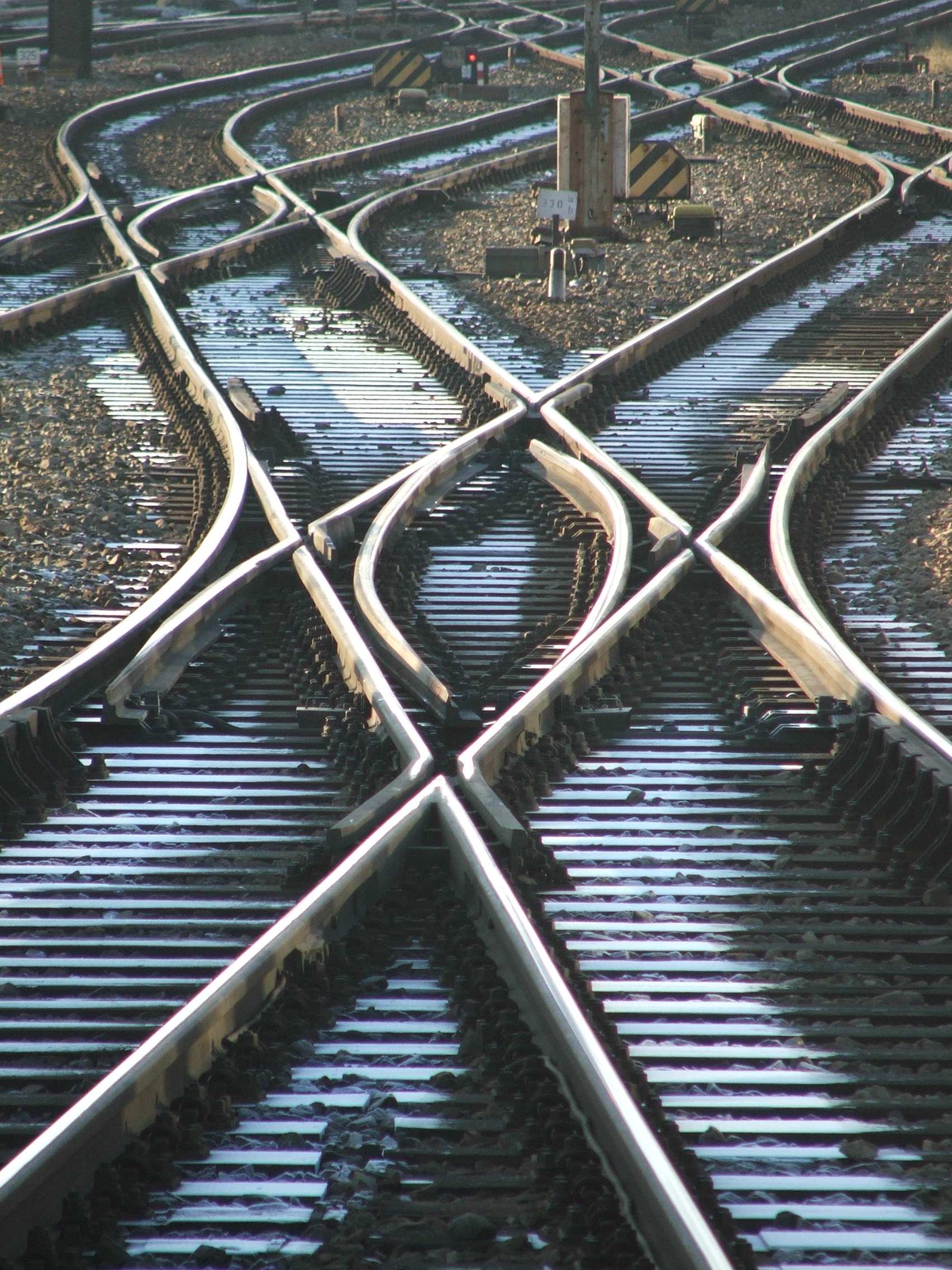
A double switch, or double slip—the points are set to connect the upper left and lower right tracks.

A double slip switch (double slip) is a narrow-angled diagonal flat crossing of two lines combined with four pairs of points in such a way as to allow vehicles to change from one straight track to the other, alternatively to going straight across. A train approaching the arrangement may leave by either of the two tracks on the opposite side of the crossing. To reach the third possible exit, the train must change tracks on the slip and then reverse.

The arrangement gives the possibility of setting four routes, but because only one route can be traversed at a time, the four blades at each end of the crossing are often connected to move in unison, so the crossing can be worked by just two levers or point motors. This gives the same functionality of two points placed end to end. These compact (albeit complex) switches usually are found only in locations where space is limited, such as station throats (i.e. approaches) where a few main lines spread out to reach any of numerous platform tracks.

In North American English, the arrangement may also be called a double switch, or more colloquially, a puzzle switch. The Great Western Railway in the United Kingdom used the term double compound points, and the switch is also known as a double compound in Victoria (Australia). In Italian, the term for a double switch is deviatoio inglese, which means 'English switch'. Likewise, it is called Engels(e) wissel in Dutch and, occasionally, Engländer ('English one', literally 'Englishman') in German.

==== Single slip ====
A single slip switch works on the same principle as a double slip, but provides for only one switching possibility. Trains approaching on one of the two crossing tracks can either continue over the crossing, or switch tracks to the other line. However, trains from the other track can only continue over the crossing, and cannot switch tracks. This is normally used to allow access to sidings and improve safety by avoiding having switch blades facing the usual direction of traffic. To reach the sidings from what would be a facing direction, trains must continue over the crossing, then reverse along the curved route (usually onto the other line of a double track) and can then move forward over the crossing into the siding.

==== Outside slip ====
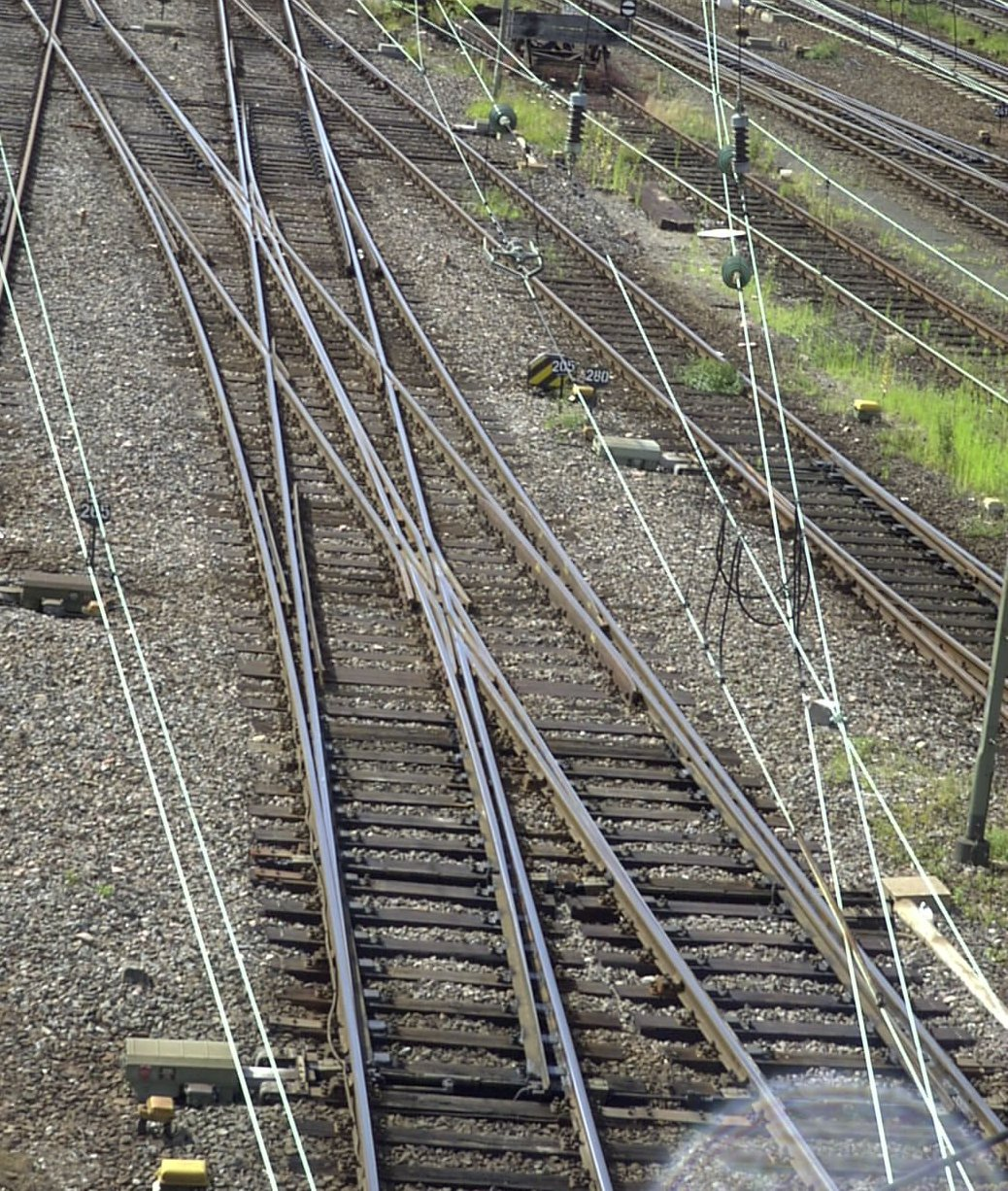
A double, outside slip in Heidelberg main station

An outside slip switch is similar to the double or single slip switches described above, except that the switch blades are outside of the diamond instead of inside. An advantage over an inside slip switch is that trains can pass the slips with higher speeds. A disadvantage over an inside slip switch is that they are longer and need more space.

An outside slip switch can be so long that its slips do not overlap at all, as in the example pictured. In such a case a single, outside slip switch is the same as two regular switches and a regular crossing. Double outside slip switches are only used in rare, specific cases.

=== Crossover ===
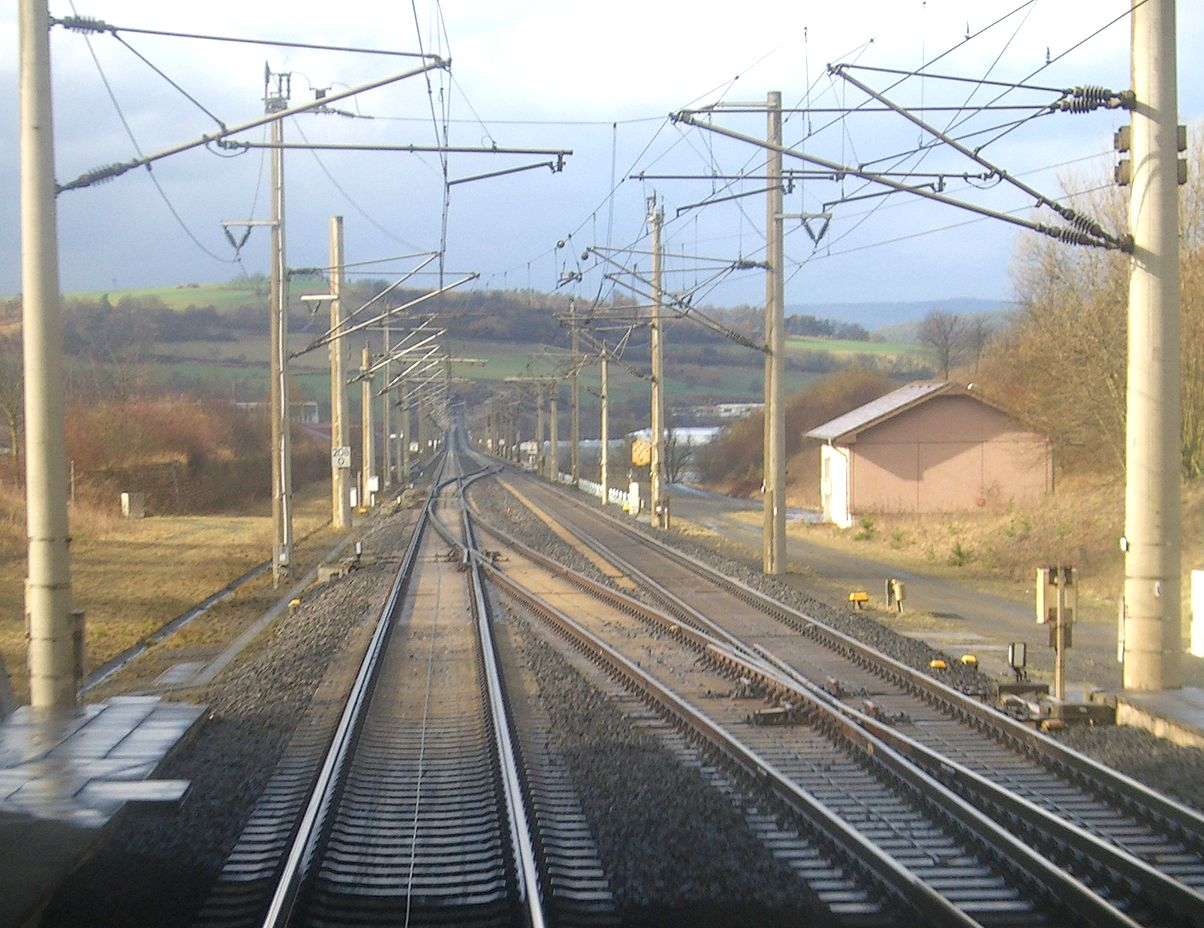
A universal crossover at Richthof between Kirchheim and Langenschwarz stations on the Hanover–Würzburg high-speed railway

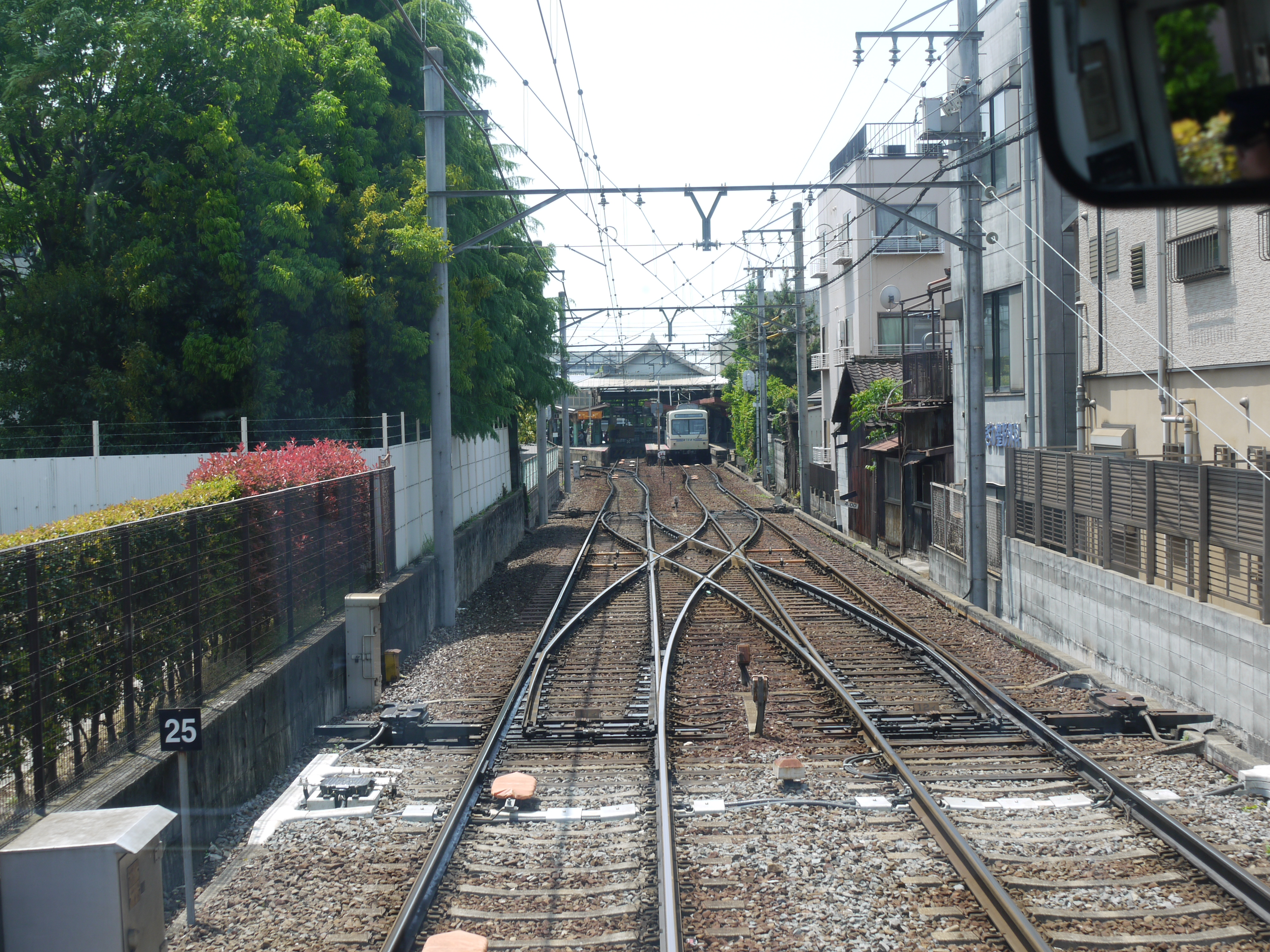
A scissors crossover: two pairs of switches linking two tracks to each other in both directions

A crossover is a pair of switches that connects two parallel rail tracks, allowing a train on one track to cross over to the other. Like the switches themselves, crossovers can be described as either facing or trailing.

When two crossovers are present in opposite directions, one after the other, the four-switch configuration is called a universal crossover. If the crossovers overlap to form an × in the center, it is called a double crossover, a scissors crossover, or just scissors; due to requiring a diamond crossing in the center, it is also sometimes known as a diamond crossover. This makes for a very compact track layout, but requires more maintenance and is more expensive to produce.

In a setup where each of the two tracks normally carries trains of only one direction, a crossover can be used either to detour "wrong-rail" around an obstruction or to reverse direction. A crossover can also join two tracks of the same direction, possibly a pair of local and express tracks, and allow trains to switch from one to the other.

On a crowded system, routine use of crossovers (or switches in general) will reduce throughput, as use of the switch blocks multiple tracks. For this reason, on some high-capacity rapid transit systems, crossovers between local and express tracks are not used during normal rush hour service, and service patterns are planned around use of the usually flying junctions at each end of the local-express line.

=== Stub ===
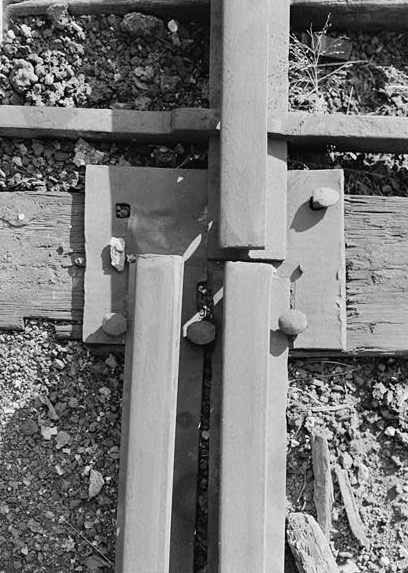
Closeup of a stub switch in Pennsylvania

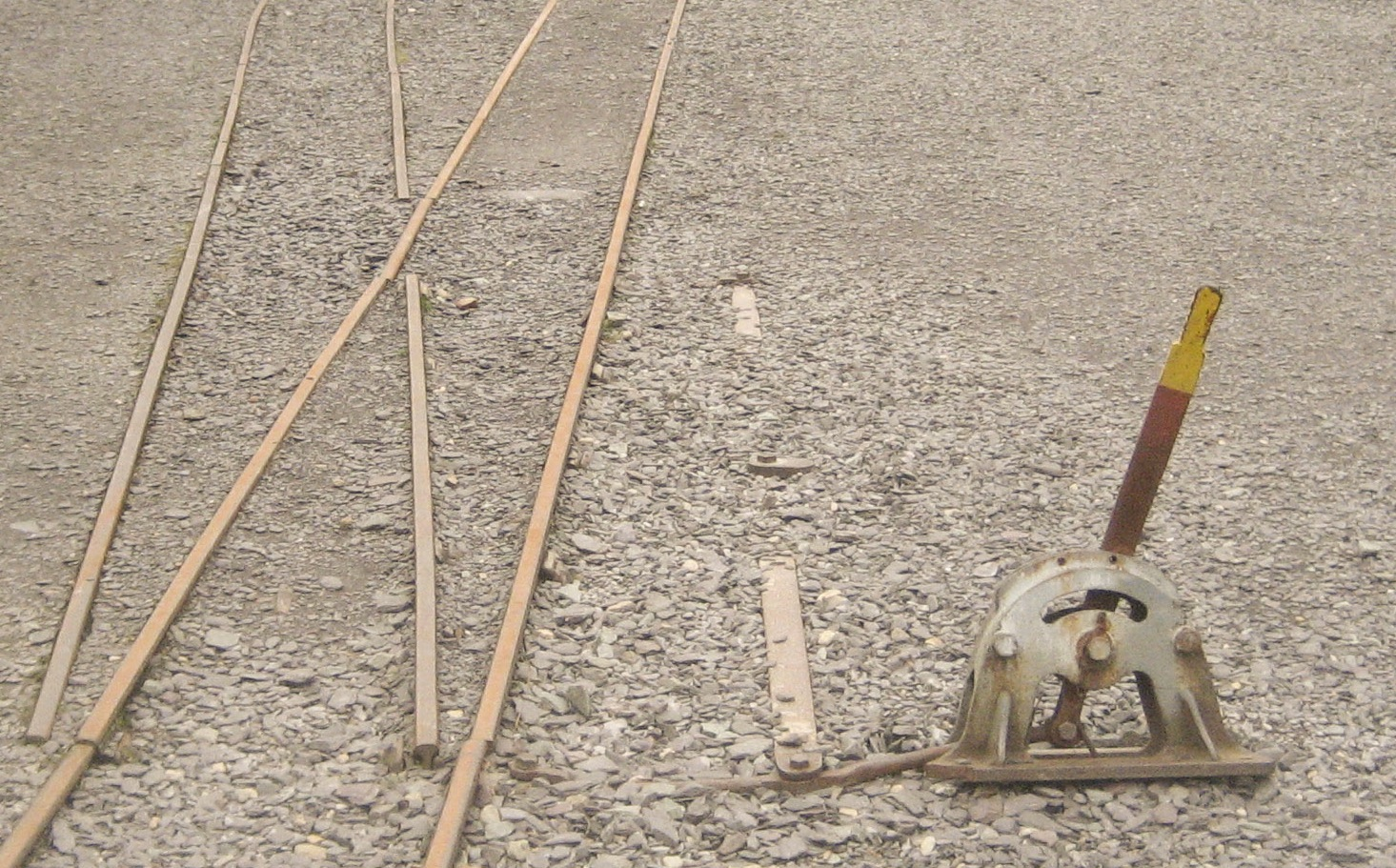
A narrow-gauge stub switch—this switch has an additional piece of movable rail instead of a frog.

A stub switch lacks the tapered points (point blades) of a typical switch. Instead, both the movable rails and the ends of the rails of the diverging routes have their ends cut off square. The switch mechanism aligns the movable rails with the rails of one of the diverging routes. In 19th century US railroad use, the stub switch was typically used in conjunction with a harp switch stand.

The rails leading up to a stub switch are not secured to the sleepers for several feet, and rail alignment across the gap is not positively enforced. Stub switches also require some flexibility in the rails (meaning lighter rails), or an extra joint at which they hinge. Therefore, these switches cannot be traversed at high speed or by heavy traffic and so are not suitable for main line use. A further disadvantage is that a stub switch being approached from the diverging route that is not connected by the points would result in a derailment. Yet another disadvantage is that in very hot weather, expansion of the steel in the rails can cause the movable rails to stick to the stock rails, making switching impossible until the rails have cooled and contracted.

One advantage to stub switches is that they work better in the snow. The sideways action of the point rails pushes snow to the side, instead of packing the snow between the points and the rail in a more modern design.

Stub switches were more common in the very early days of railways and their tramway predecessors. Now, because of their disadvantages, stub switches are used primarily on narrow-gauge and branch lines.

=== Three way ===
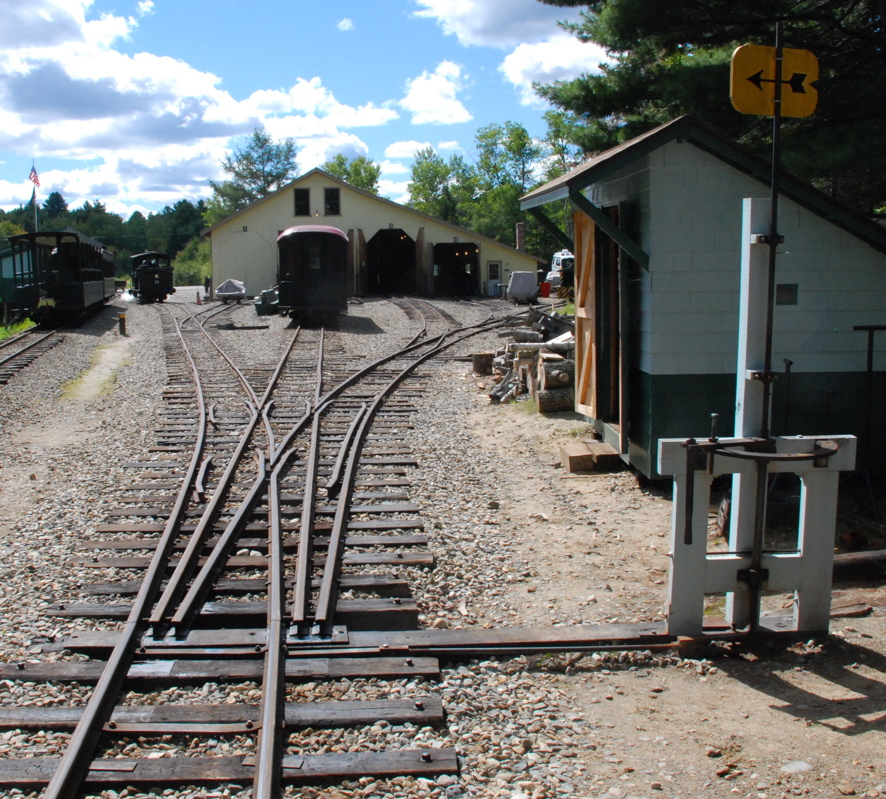
A three-way stub switch at Sheepscot station on the Wiscasset, Waterville and Farmington Railway

A three-way switch is used to split a railroad track into three divergent paths rather than the more usual two. There are two types of three-way switches. In a symmetrical three-way switch, the left and right branches diverge at the same place. In an asymmetrical three-way switch, the branches diverge in a staggered way using two interlaced turnouts. Both types of three-way switches require three frogs.

The complexity of symmetrical switches usually results in speed restrictions, therefore three-way switches are most often used in stations or depots where space is restricted and low speeds are normal. Symmetrical switches were used quite often on Swiss narrow-gauge railways. Asymmetrical three-way switches are more common, because they do not have speed restrictions compared to standard switches. However, because of their higher maintenance cost due to special parts as well as asymmetric wear, both types of three-way switches are replaced with two standard switches wherever possible.

In areas with very low speeds, like depots, and on railroads that had to be built very cheaply, like logging railroads, three-way switches were sometimes built as stub switches.

=== Plate ===
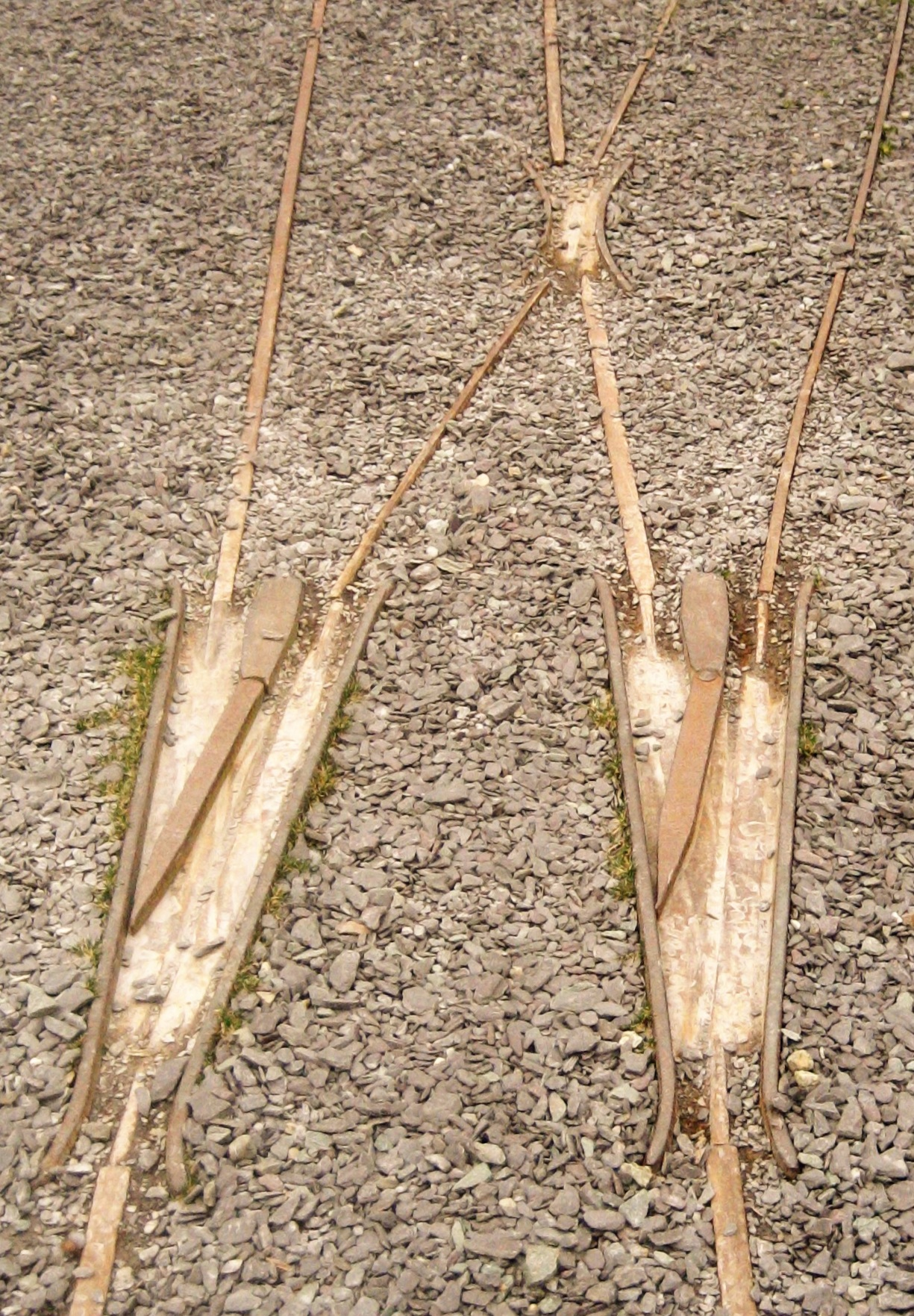
A narrow-gauge plate switch

A plate switch incorporates the tapered points of a typical switch into a self-contained plate. Each point blade is moved separately by hand. Plate switches are only used for double-flanged wheels, with wheels running through the plates on their flanges, guided by the edges of the plate and the movable blade.

=== Off-railer ===
The off-railer is a system of installing a turnout over and above some plain track, without having to cut or replace that track. It is useful for installing temporary branches on agricultural railways, and sidings for track machines on mainline rails. Special ramps lift the wheels off the normal track, and then the off-railer curves away as required. Decauville has such a system. It is similar to a drawbridge crossing.

=== Interlaced turnout ===
Chicago Transit Authority switch tower 18 interlaced turnout
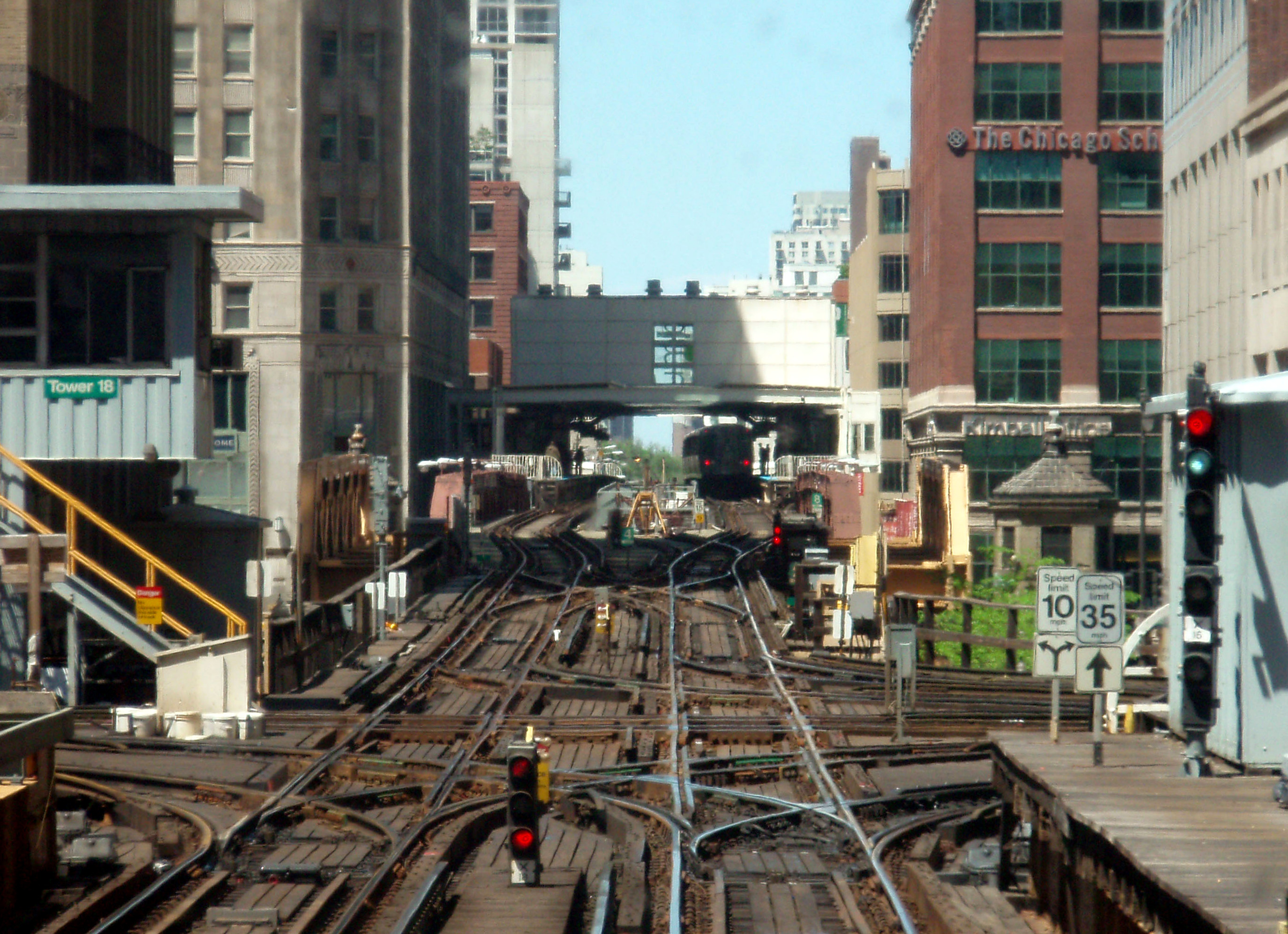
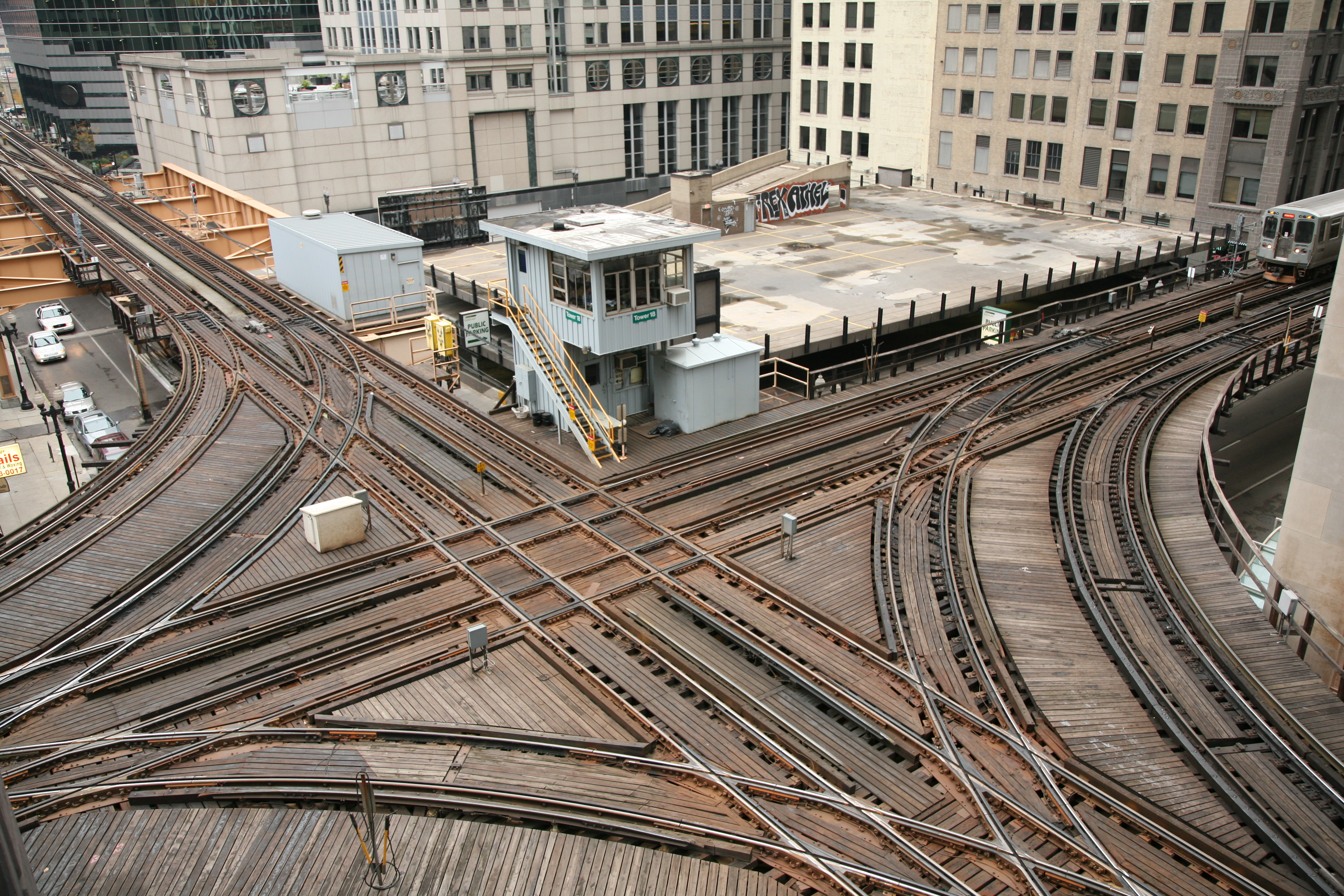
Interlaced turnouts on the elevated Chicago "L" northbound and southbound Purple and Brown lines intersecting with eastbound and westbound Pink and Green lines and the looping Orange line above the Wells and Lake street intersection in The Loop

An interlaced turnout is a method of splitting a track into three or more divergent paths. It is an arrangement of two standard turnouts, usually one left- and one right-handed, in an "interlaced" fashion. The points of the second turnout are positioned between the points and the frog of the first turnout. In common with other forms of three way turnouts an additional frog is required.

=== Wye ===
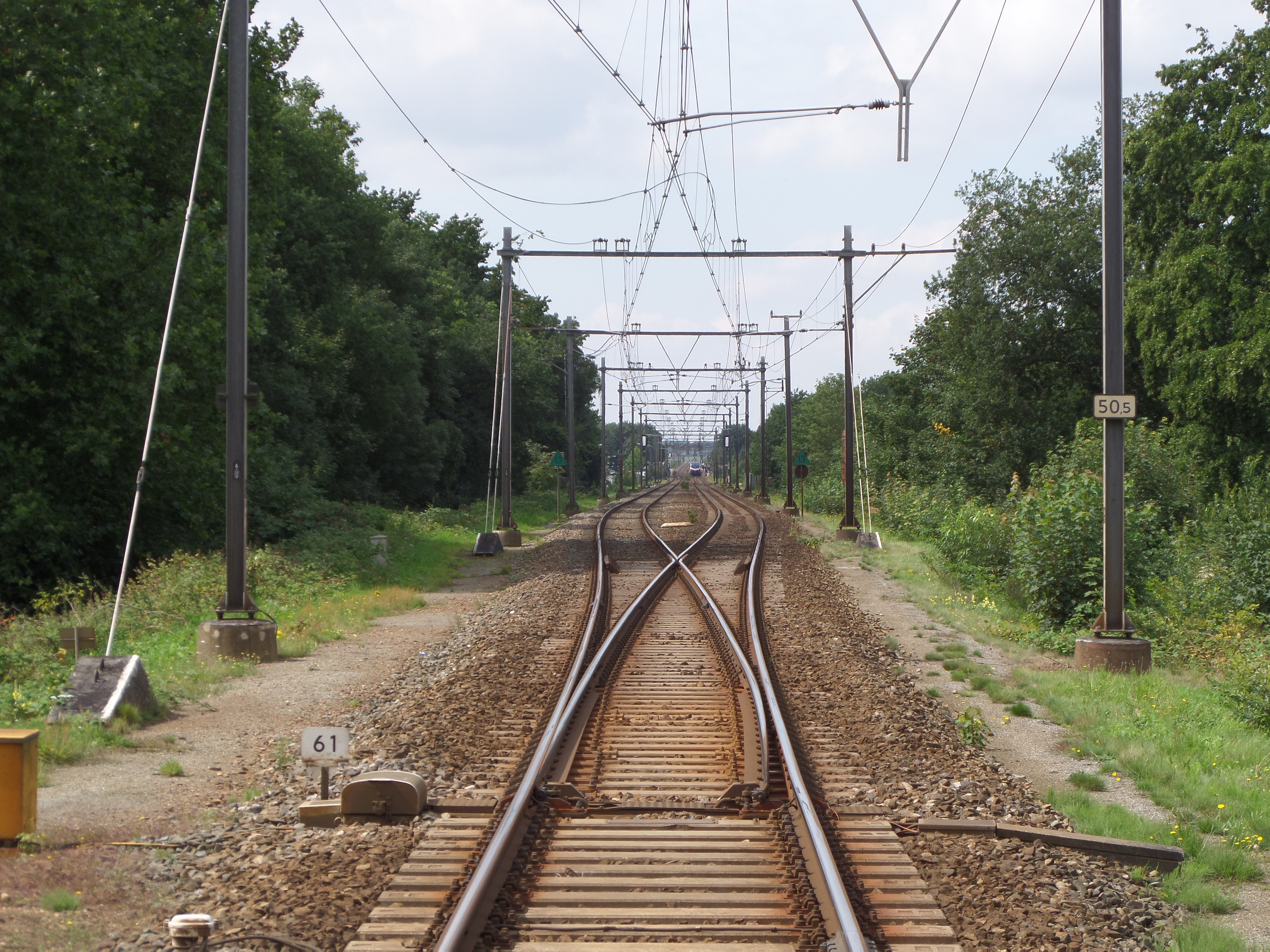
A wye switch on the mainline, leading to a single-track bridge, near Ravenstein, Netherlands

A wye switch (Y points) has trailing ends which diverge symmetrically and in opposite directions. The name originates from the similarity of their shape to that of the letter Y. Wye switches are usually used where space is at a premium. In North America this is also called an "equilateral switch" or "equilateral turnout". Common switches are more often associated with mainline speeds, whereas wye switches are generally low-speed yard switches.

One advantage of wye switches is that they can have a coarser frog angle using the same radius of curvature than a common switch. This means that they give rise to a less severe speed restriction than the diverging branch of a common switch, without having to resort to more expensive switches with a moving frog. For this reason they are sometimes used on a main line where it splits into two equally important branches or at the ends of a single track section in an otherwise double track line.

=== Run off ===
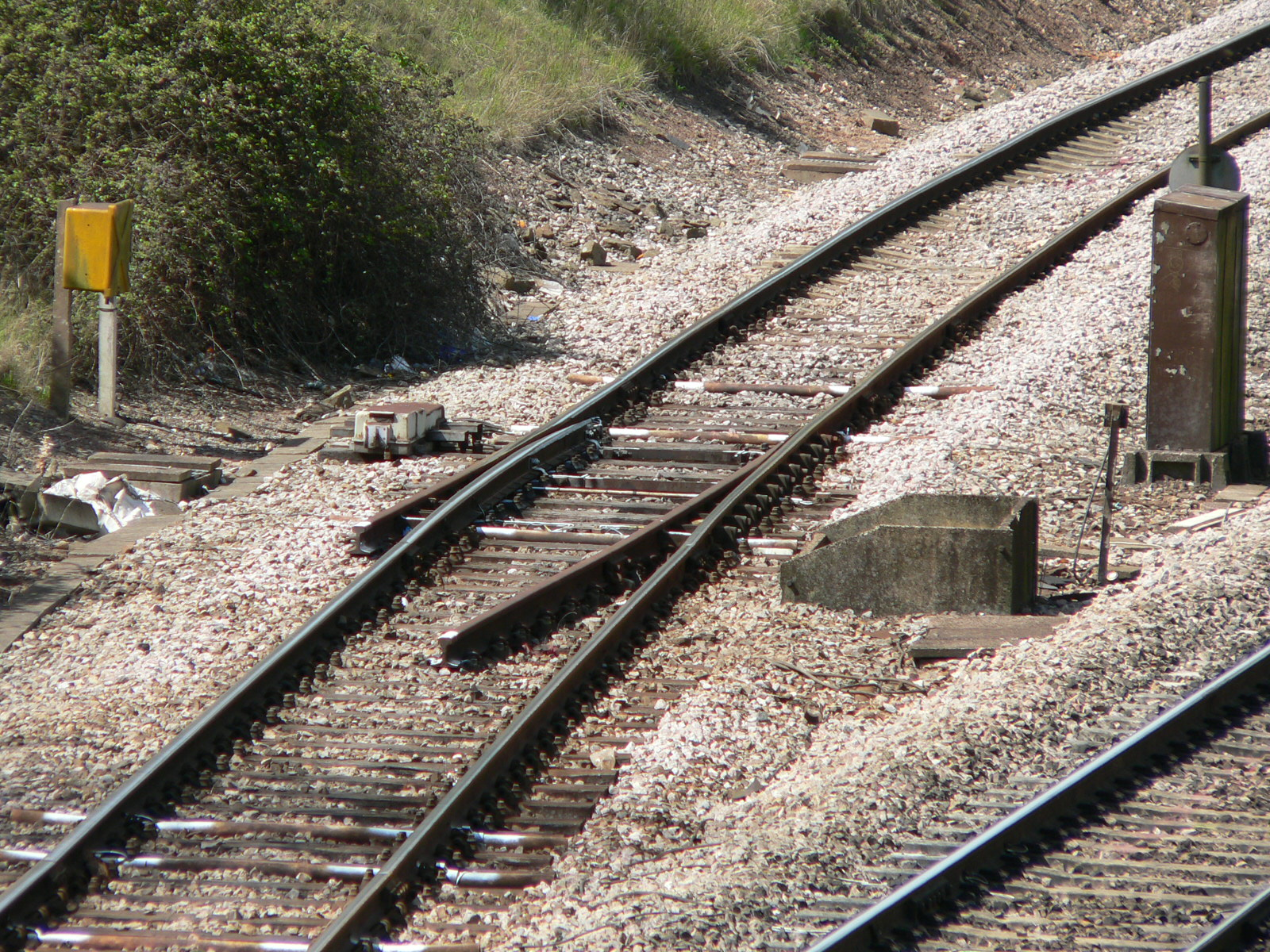
Trap points at the exit from a yard

Run-off points are used to protect main lines from stray or runaway cars, or from trains passing signals set at danger. In these cases, vehicles would otherwise roll onto and foul (obstruct) the main line and cause a collision. Depending on the situation in which they are used, run-off points are referred to either as trap points or catch points. Derailers are another device used for the same purpose.

Catch points are installed on the running line itself, where the railway climbs at a steep gradient. They are used to prevent runaway vehicles colliding with another train further down the slope. In some cases, catch points lead into a sand drag to safely stop the runaway vehicle, which may be traveling at speed. Catch points are usually held in the 'derail' position by a spring. They can be set to allow a train to pass safely in the downhill direction using a lever or other mechanism to override the spring for a short time.

Catch points originate from the days of the 'unfitted' goods (freight) train. As these trains tended to consist of either completely unbraked wagons (relying entirely on the locomotive's own brakes), or ones with unlinked, manually applied brakes (necessitating a stop at the top of steep downgrades for the guard to walk along the train and set the brakes on each wagon in turn), they also lacked any mechanism to automatically brake runaway cars. Catch points were therefore required to stop the rear portion of a poorly coupled train that might break away while climbing a steep grade – although they would also stop vehicles that ran away for any other reason. Now that trains are all 'fitted' (and broken couplings are far less common), catch points are mostly obsolete.

Similar to catch points, trap points are provided at the exit from a siding or where a goods line joins a line that may be used by passenger trains. Unless they have been specifically set to allow traffic to pass onto the main line, the trap points will direct any approaching vehicle away from the main line. This may simply result in the vehicle being derailed, but in some cases a sand drag is used, especially where the vehicle is likely to be a runaway traveling at speed due to a slope.

==== Derailers ====
A derailer works by derailing any vehicle passing over it. There are different types of derailers, but in some cases they consist of a single switch point installed in a track. The point can be pulled into a position to derail any equipment that is not supposed to pass through.

=== Dual gauge ===
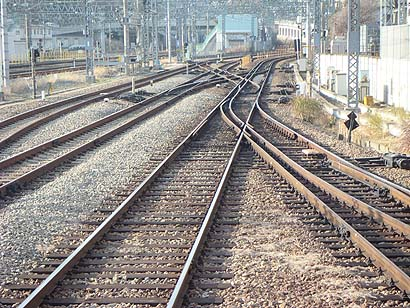
A dual-gauge switch in Japan

Dual gauge switches are used in dual gauge systems. There are various possible scenarios involving the routes that trains on each gauge may take, including the two gauges separating or one gauge being able to choose between diverging paths and the other not. Because of the extra track involved, dual gauge switches have more points and frogs than their single gauge counterparts. This limits speeds even more than usual.

A related formation is the 'swish' or rail exchange, where (usually) the common rail changes sides. These have no moving parts, the narrower gauge wheels being guided by guard rails as they transition from one rail to another. The wider gauge only encounters continuous rail so is unaffected by the exchange. At dual gauge turntables, a similar arrangement is used to move the narrow-gauge track from one side to a central position.

=== Rack railway ===
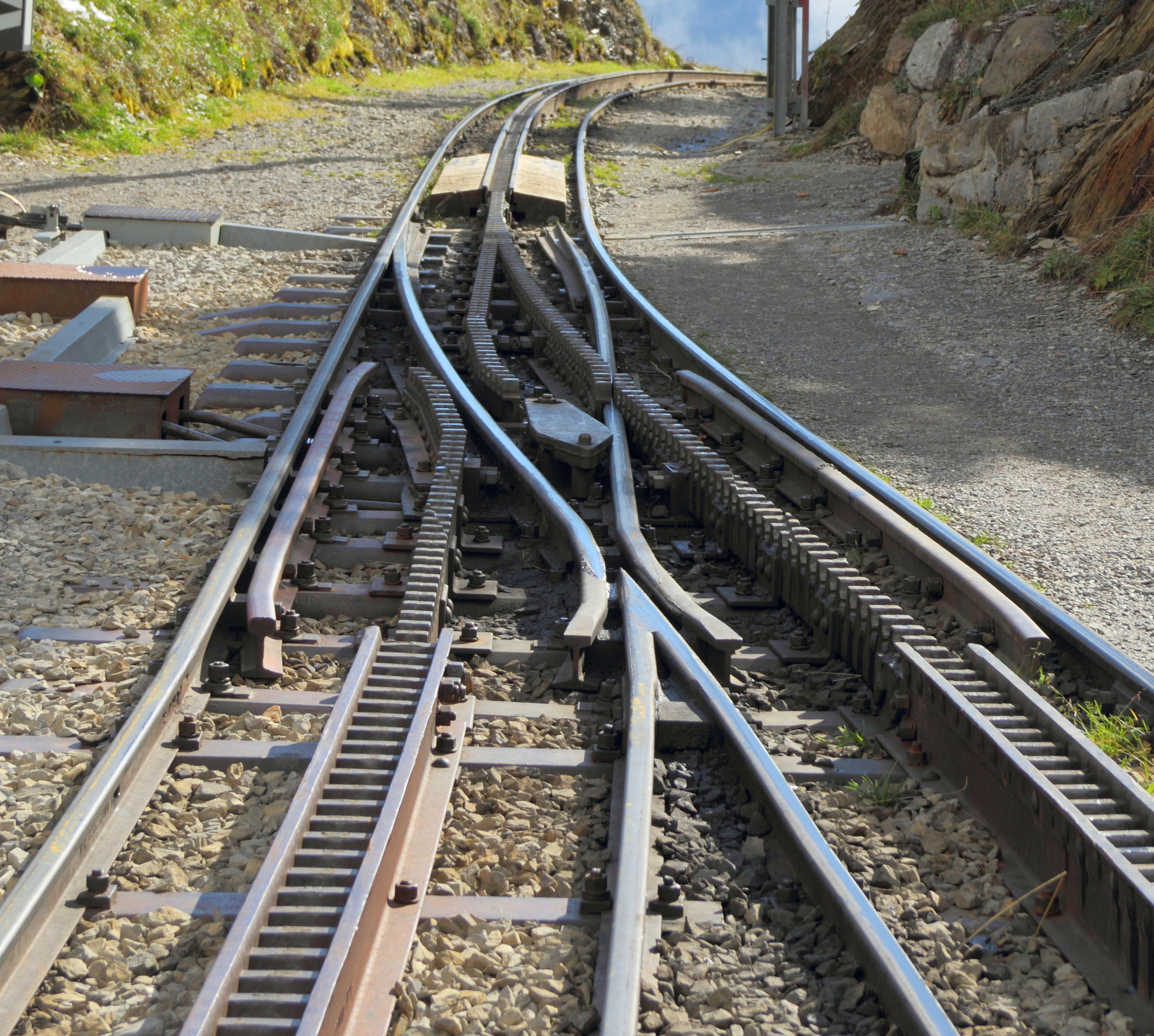
Railroad switch of the Schynige Platte Railway (at Schynige Platte, Switzerland)

Rack-railway switches are as varied as rack-railway technologies. Where use of the rack is optional, as on the Zentralbahn in Switzerland or the West Coast Wilderness Railway in Tasmania, it is common to place turnouts only in relatively flat areas where the rack is not needed. On systems where only the pinion is driven and the conventional rail wheels are idlers, such as the Dolderbahn in Zürich, Štrbské Pleso in Slovakia and the Schynige Platte rack railway, the rack must be continuous through the switch. The Dolderbahn switch works by bending all three rails, an operation that is performed every trip as the two trains pass in the middle. The Štrbské Pleso and Schynige Platte Strub rack system instead relies on a complex set of moving points which assemble the rack in the traversed direction and simultaneously clear the crossed direction conventional rails. In some rack systems, such as the Morgan system, where locomotives always have multiple driving pinions, it is possible to simplify turnouts by interrupting the rack rail, so long as the interruption is shorter than the spacing between the drive pinions on the locomotives.

==== Two-track transfer table ====
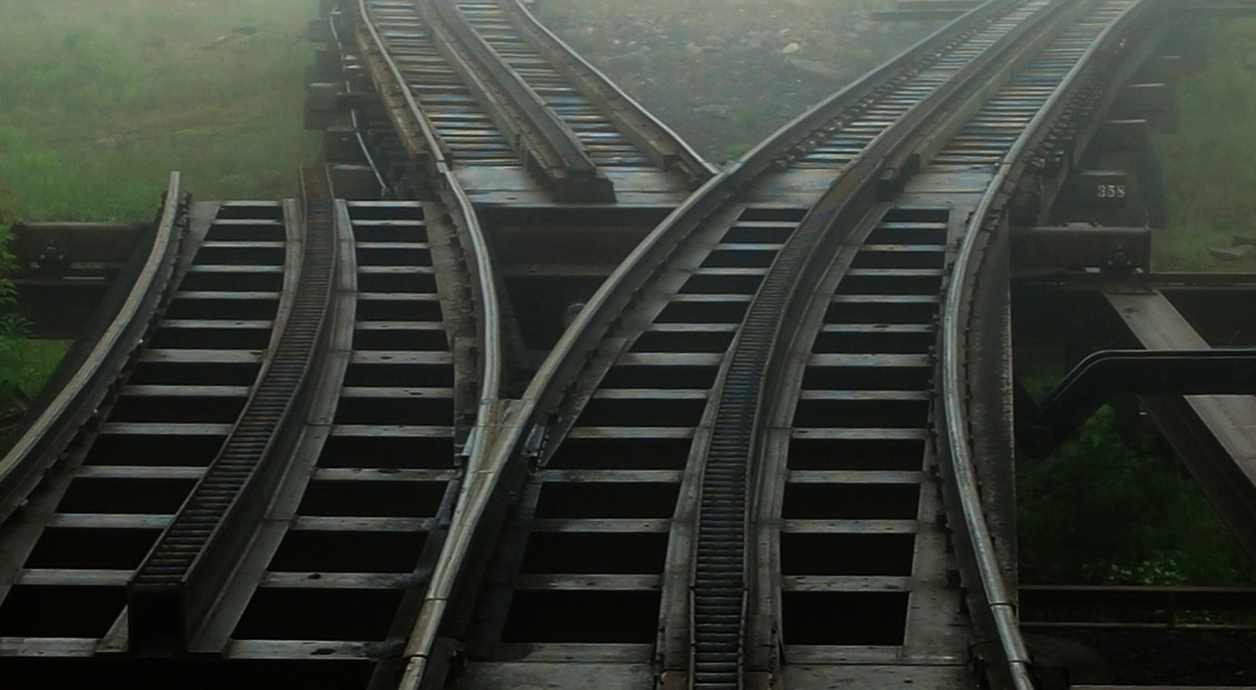
A two-track transfer table used as a switch at Mount Washington Cog Railway

The Riggenbach rack is not bendable unlike rails or Abt rack bars. The first Riggenbach switch with many moveable parts was built in 1875 for the Rorschach–Heiden railway in Wienacht-Tobel, Switzerland. The first turnouts on the Vitznau–Rigi railway line were introduced in 1873 and were two-track transfer tables, having a track going to the right and one going to the left. The table can be moved to give a through-going track either to the left or to the right passing loop. Unlike normal transfer tables they are only moved empty: trains proceed only when the table is fixed in one of the two final positions. The transfer tables on the Rigibahn were replaced in 1959–1961 with switches, but Pilatus railway and the Mount Washington railway still use this system, because normal switches cannot be installed.

==== Rotary switch ====
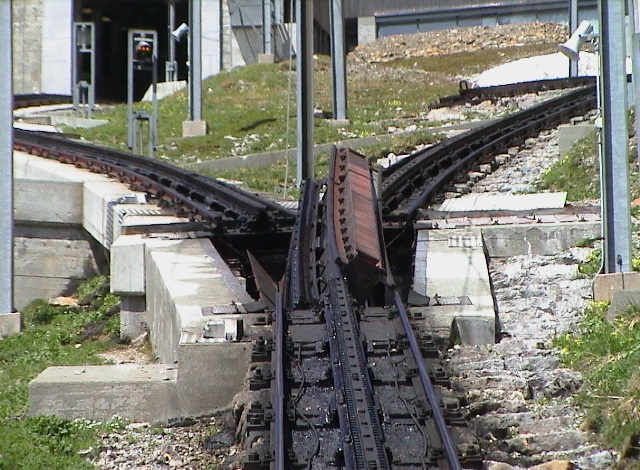
A Pilatus Railway turnout consisting of a bridge that rotates about its lengthwise axle

Rotary switches (German: Gleiswender) with two different tracks were introduced on the Pilatus railway in the 1960s to replace two-track transfer tables. The Pilatus railway uses a unique Locher rack system with horizontally working cogwheels. This arrangement does not allow other types of turnouts.

A rotary switch rotates about its long axis to present a track connection to a chosen set of tracks. Physically, it flips over (rotates about its long axis 180 degrees) to connect to the chosen set of tracks. Once the rotary switch is secured the train can proceed. Pinion alignment is maintained in both positions.

=== Diamond ===
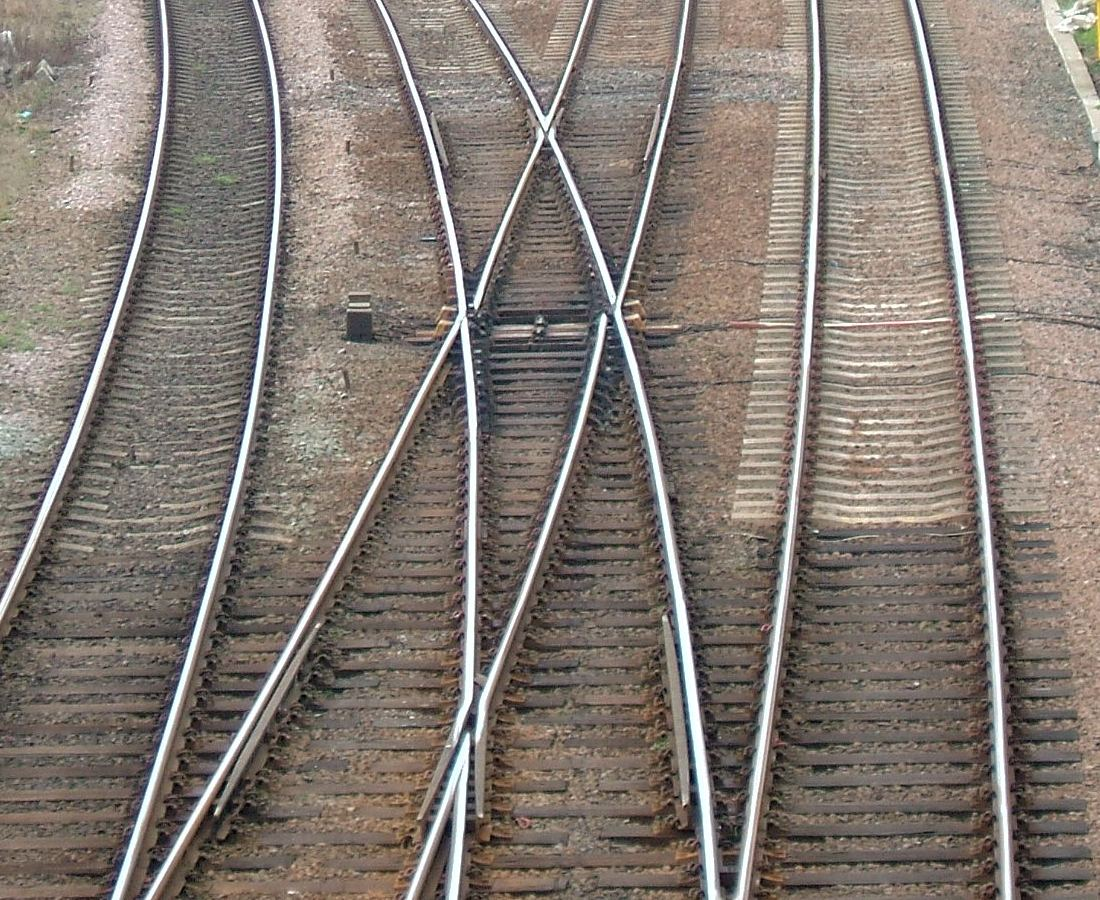
A switch diamond at a junction in the UK

Although not strictly speaking a turnout, a switch diamond is an active trackwork assembly used where the crossing angle between two tracks is too shallow for totally passive trackwork: the unguided sections of each rail would overlap. These vaguely resemble two standard points assembled very closely toe-to-toe. These would also often utilize swingnose crossings at the outer ends to ensure complete wheel support in the same way as provided on shallow angle turnouts. In North America these are known as movable-point diamonds. In the UK, where the angle of divergence is shallower than 1 in 8 (center-line measure) a switched diamond will be found rather than a passive or fixed diamond.

Such switches are usually implemented on the basis of increasing the safe crossing speed. Open blades impose a speed restriction, due to the potential of the crossing impact fracturing the rail as both wheels on each axle hit the crossing gaps almost simultaneously. Switched blades, as shown in the photograph, allow a much higher speed across the gap by providing an essentially continuous piece of rail across the gap on both sides.

The frog end of the switched crossing, despite still having a gap in one rail, is less problematic in this regard. The outer rail is still continuous, the wing rail (the part that turns out, after the frog gap) provides a gradual transition, and the check rail avoids the possibility of points splitting. This can be seen in how, under examination, the wing rail has a wider polished section, showing how the wheel load is transferred across the gap.

=== Single point ===
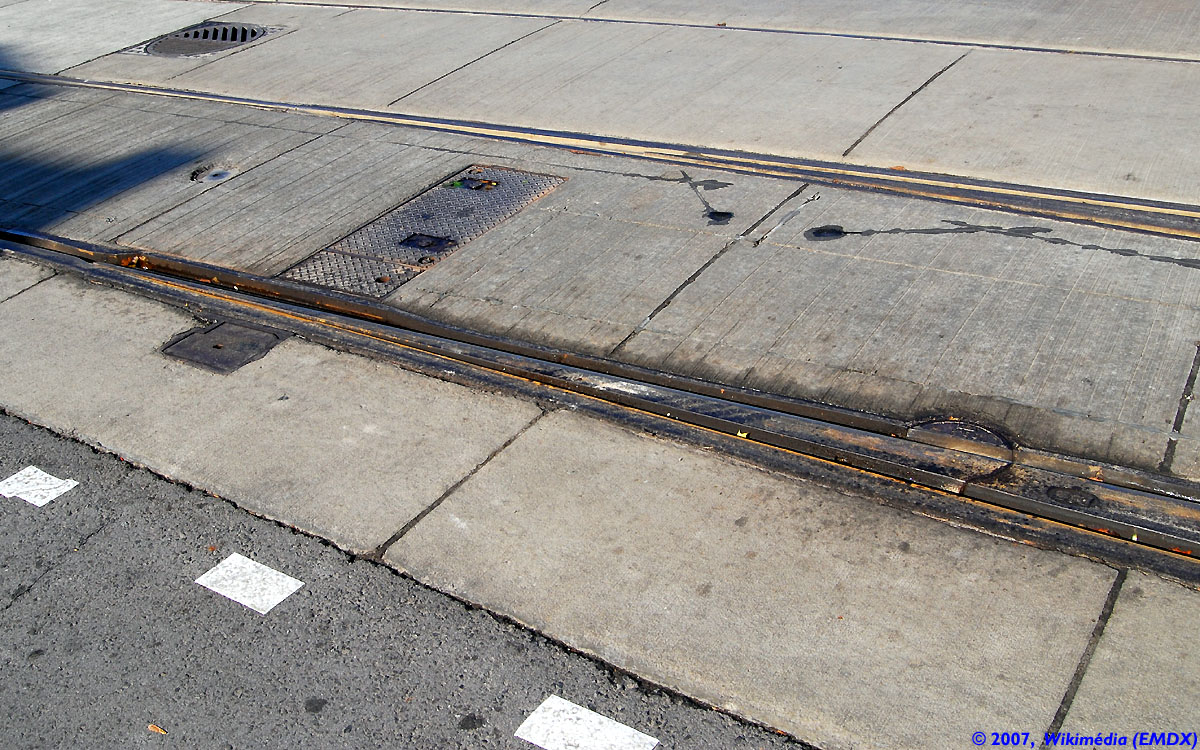
A single-point switch on the Toronto streetcar system

Single point switches, known as Tongue and Plain Mate switches, are sometimes used on freight railways in slow speed operation in paved areas such as in ports. In the United States, they are regulated by provision 213.135(i) of the Federal Railroad Administration Track Safety Standards.

On streetcar (tram) systems using grooved rails, if the wheels on both sides of the car are connected by a rigid solid axle, only one switchpoint is needed to steer it onto one or the other track. The switchpoint will be on inside rail of the switch's curve route. When a streetcar enters the curve route of the switch, the wheel on the inside of the curve (the right side of the car on a right turn) is pulled into the turn, and through the axle, directs the wheel on the outside to also follow the curve. The outside wheel is supported for a short distance by its flange running in the groove.

Some low-floor streetcar designs use split axles (a separate half-axle for the wheel on each side of the car). Such streetcars are unsuitable for use with single-point switches as there is no mechanism to transfer the force from the inner to the outer wheels at switches.

A single-point switch is cheaper to build, especially in street trackage, as there is no need to link to a second switchpoint.

=== Temporary ===
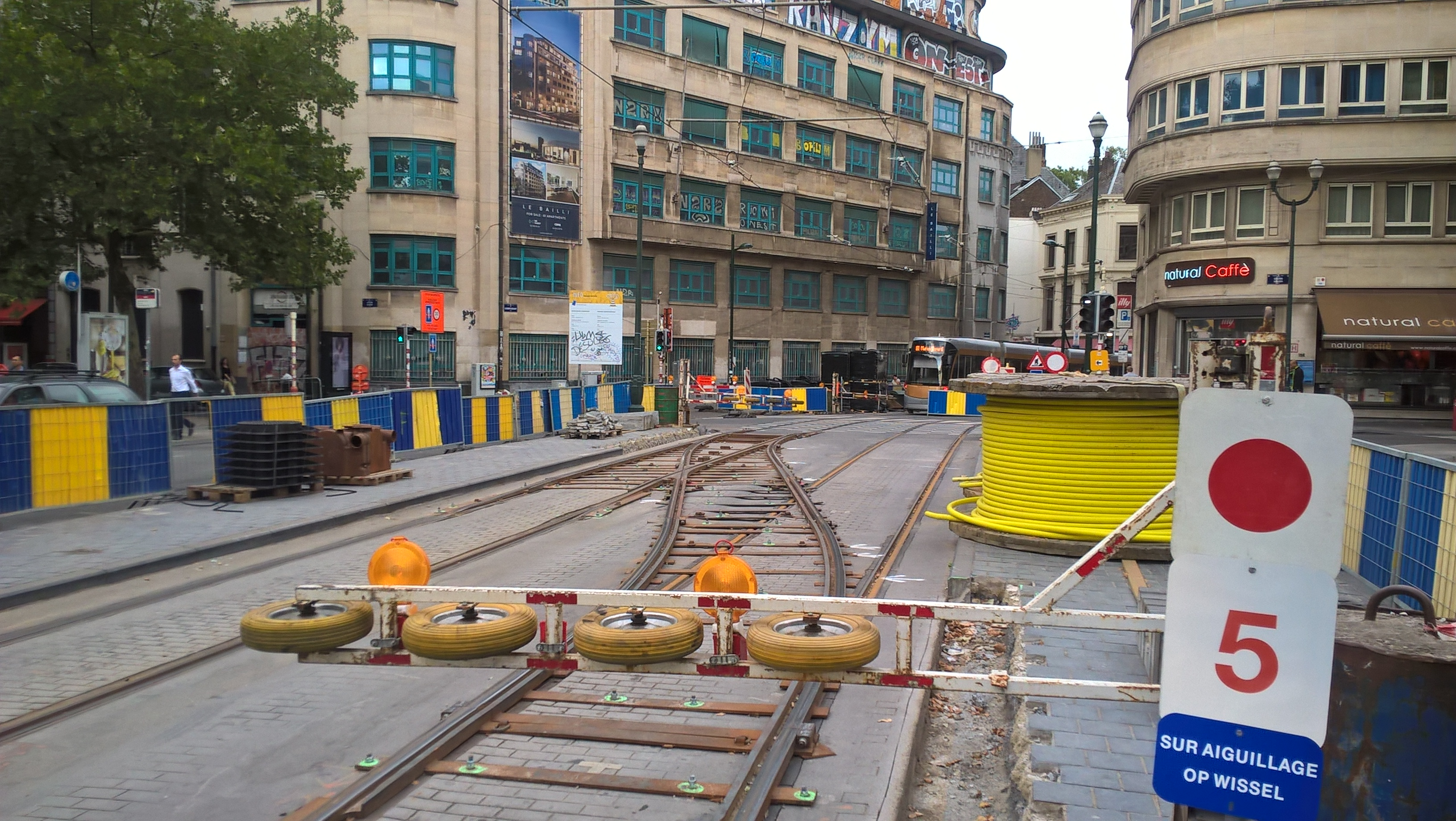
Temporary or 'Californian' points installed on tramline 81 at the junction of Avenue Louise and Rue Bailli (in French), a.k.a. Louisalaan and Baljuwstraat (in Dutch), Brussels

When a tram track is interrupted during repairs, a set of temporary points may be placed on top of existing track to allow trams to cross to the parallel track. These are known as Kletterweichen or Auflegeweichen in German, aiguillages californiens in French, and oplegwissels, klimwissels or Californische wissels in Dutch. They may be welded into place and allow trams to pass at walking pace.

== Speeds over turnouts ==
Higher-speed turnouts in the United States include:

- no. 26.5: 60 mph (97 km/h)
- no. 32.7: 80 mph (130 km/h)

Such specifications, however, are by no means universal: 1:16 is specified for 62 mph (100 km/h) standard-gauge track in Uganda.

Turnouts on high-speed rail lines have much larger crossing numbers than the above, combined with swing noses.

== Assembly and transport ==
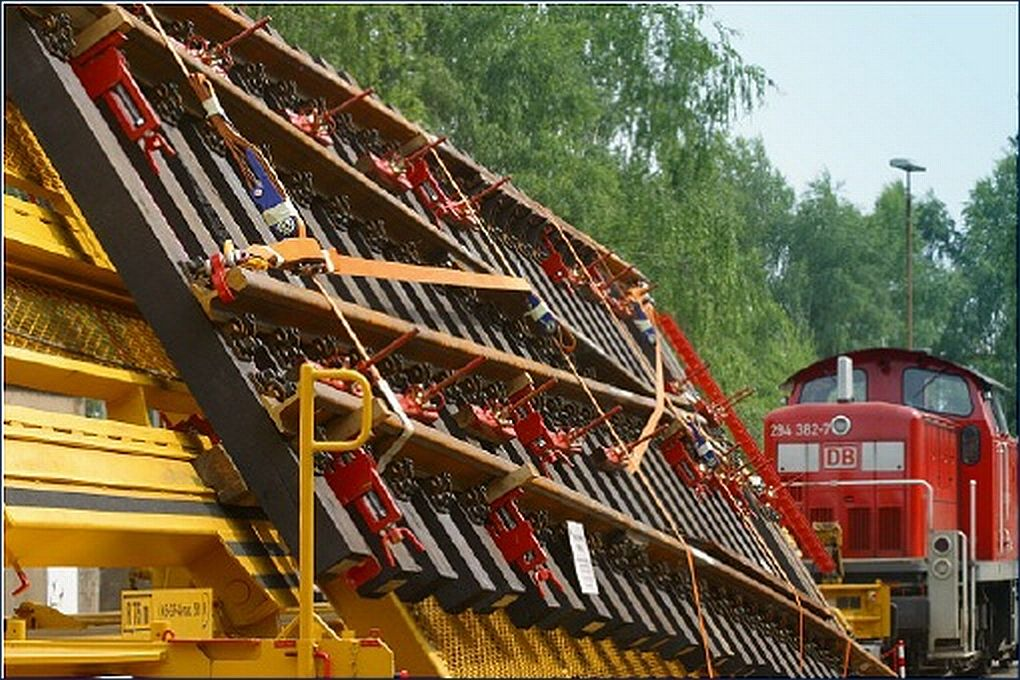
Transport of switches by rail creates problems as they are long and wide.

Turnouts are large pieces of rail infrastructure which may be too big, wide, or heavy to transport in one piece. Special wagons can carry the pieces at approximately 45° from vertical, so that they fit within the structure gauge. Once all the pieces have arrived, the turnout is assembled sleeper by sleeper on site. A set of turnouts may be trial assembled beforehand off site, to check that everything fits.

== See also ==
- 1928 Times Square derailment – New York City Subway derailment
- Centralized traffic control – Railway signalling system
- Expansion joint § Railway expansion joints
- Flange-bearing frog – Railway switch device
- Funicular § Turnout systems for two-rail funiculars
- Gauntlet track – Overlap configuration to narrow track formation
- Glossary of rail transport terms
- Minimum railway curve radius – Concept in railway engineering
- Monorail § Switching
- Rack railway § Switches
- Railway turntable – Device for turning railway rolling stock
