= Harp switch stand =

Type of railroad switch stand

Harp Switch Stand
- Classification: Railroad Switch
- Industry: Transportation
- Application: Intentional Path Deviation
- Components: Axle Pin
- Invented: 19th Century

A harp switch stand is a type of railroad switch stand that was most common during the 19th century in the United States. The name derives from the characteristic shape of the stand. The harp stand was typically used in conjunction with the stub switch. It remained in use longest among narrow gauge railroads such as the Denver & Rio Grande well into the 20th century.

The harp mechanism was a simple lever which pivoted on an axle pin located midway up the main body (the "frame") of the stand. The upper part of the lever passed through a slot atop the stand. A signal target was usually attached at the top of the lever. The lower end of the lever extended below the main body of the stand where it attached to a bar. Pulling on the lever would pull this bar which in turn would move the rail into the desired position. The lever was sometimes secured by notches along the slot at the top of the stand. Variations of this basic design were common.

Harp stands were of two types: a two-position and a three-position, for use with two-way and three-way turnouts, respectively.
