= NS Class 8800 =

Class of 27 Netherlands 0-6-0ST locomotives (ex UK War Department Austerities)

NS 8800
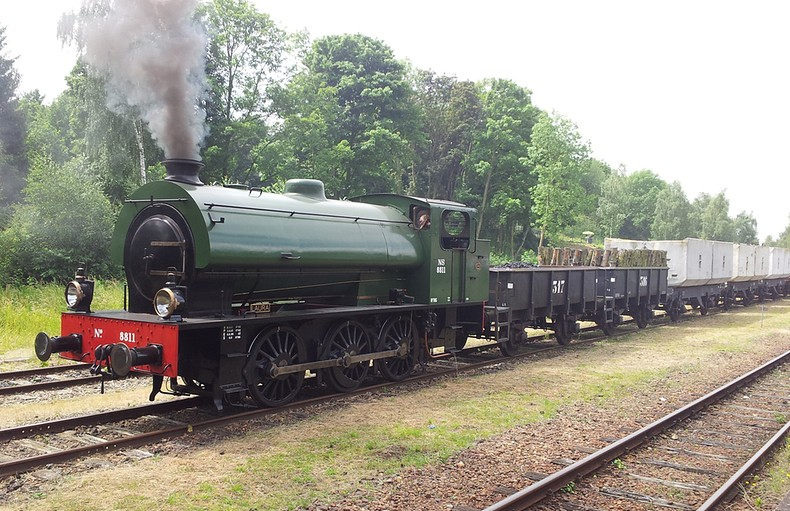
- NS 8811 of the SSN visiting Simpelveld
Type and origin
- Power type: Steam
- Builder: Hudswell Clarke, Hunslet, WG Bagnall, Robert Stephenson & Hawthorns
- Build date: 1945
- Total produced: 27
Specifications
- Configuration
  - Whyte: 0-6-0
  - UIC: C
- Gauge: 1,435 mm (4 ft 8 1/2 in)
- Driver dia.: 1,295 mm (4 ft 3.0 in)
- Length: 9,245 mm (30 ft 4.0 in)
- Height: 3,689 mm (12 ft 1.2 in)
- Loco weight: 49 t (54 short tons; 48 long tons)
- Fuel type: Coal
- Fuel capacity: 2.3 metric tons (2.5 short tons; 2.3 long tons)
- Water cap.: 5.45 m^{3} (1,200 imp gal)
- Firebox
  - Grate area: 1.56 m^{2} (16.8 sq ft)
- Boiler pressure: 12 bar (170 psi)
- Heating surface
  - Firebox: 8.1 m^{2} (87 sq ft)
  - Tubes: 72.9 m^{2} (785 sq ft)
- Cylinders: 2
- Cylinder size: 457 mm × 660 mm (18.0 in × 26.0 in)
- Valve gear: Stephenson
Performance figures
- Maximum speed: 50 km/h (31 mph)
- Tractive effort: 8,777 kN (1,973,000 lbf)
Career
- Operators: NS
- Numbers: 8801-8827
- Withdrawn: 1953-1957
- Disposition: 3 (8811, 8815 & 8826) preserved, remainder scrapped

The NS 8800 is a series of tank engines of the Dutch railway NS for the shunting service. Of the approximately 324 British-built Hunslet Austerity 0-6-0ST saddle tank locomotives, many were used by the British War Department during their fight against the German army in mainland Western Europe. The NS bought 27 of them just after World War II. They had been built by the Hunslet Engine Company (12), WG Bagnall (3), Robert Stephenson & Hawthorns (RSH) (6), and Hudswell Clarke (6).

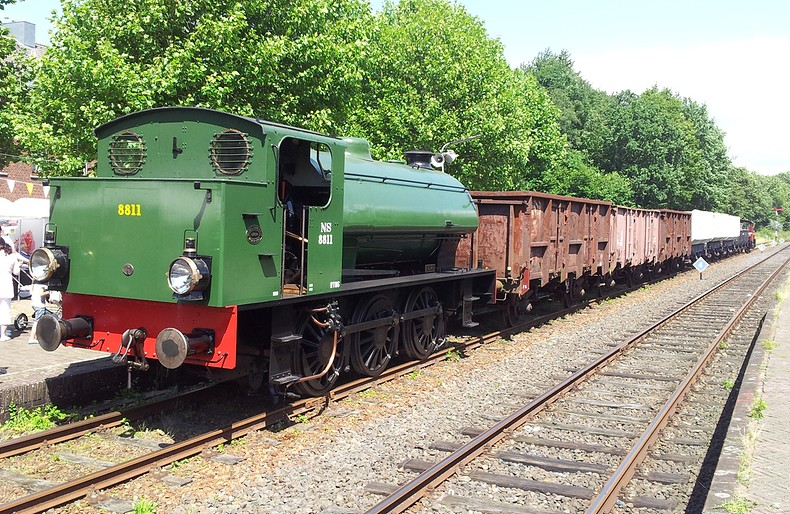
NS 8811 of the SSN.

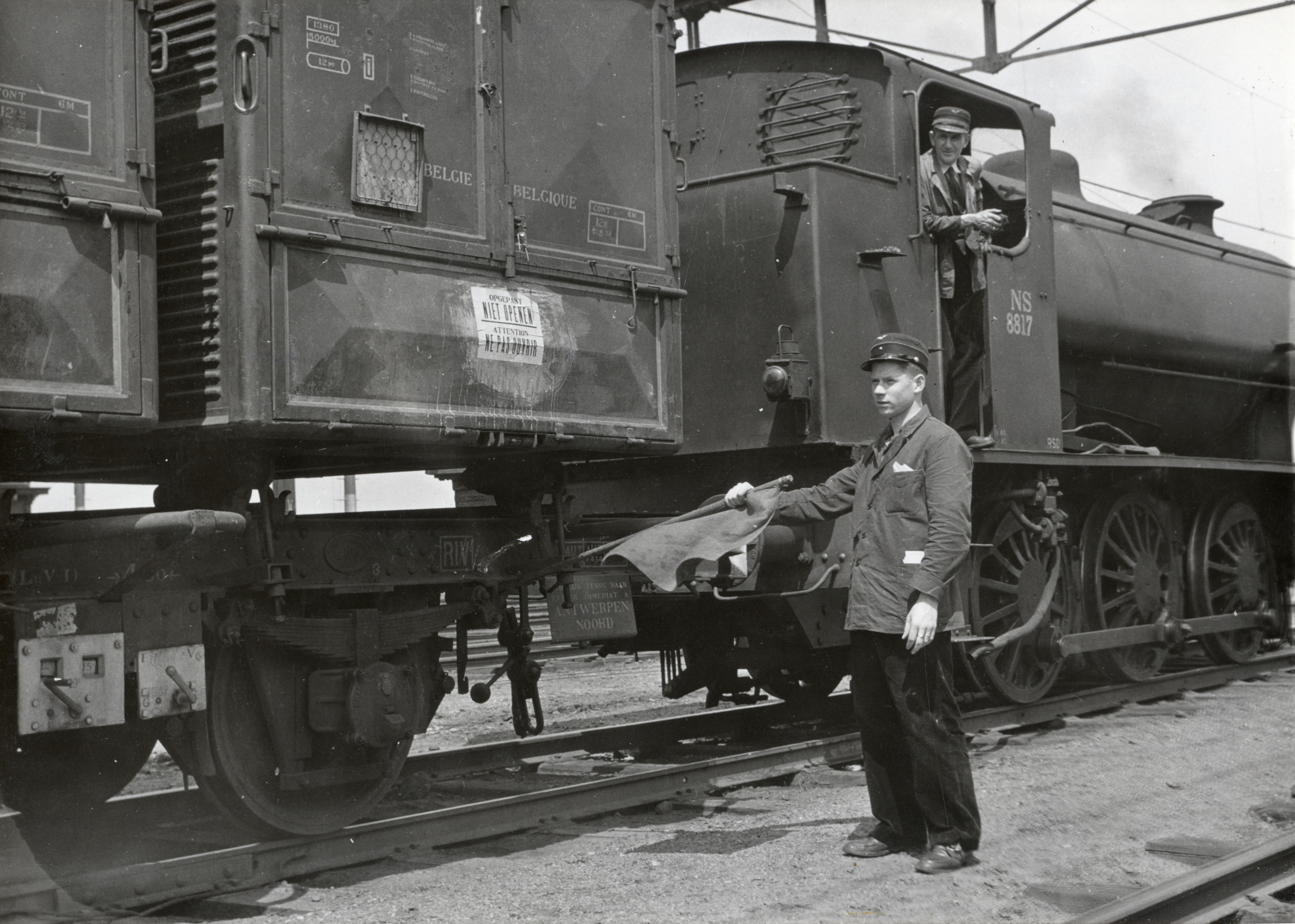
Shunter with NS 8817 at the yard in Roosendaal (04-06-1954)

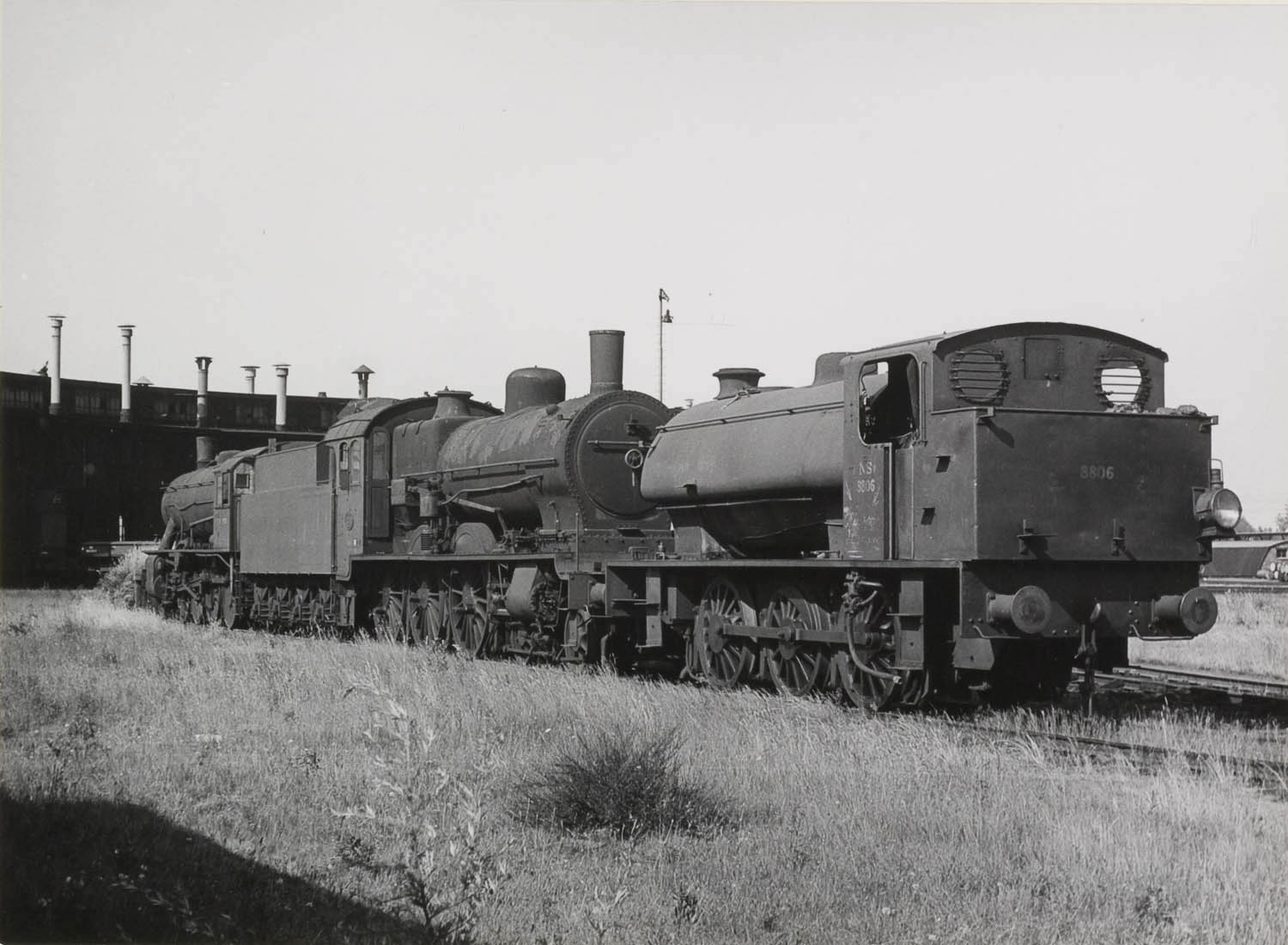
NS 8806, 3707 and 4398 awaiting scrapping. (28-06-1957)

== In NS service ==
After the departure of the British army in 1945, the Dutch Railways bought 31 copies. Four engines were sold to the Staatsmijnen in Limburg after a short time. The other 27 were assigned the NS numbers 8801-8827 and were used for shunting until 1957. They were liked by crews and were known not to "leave" any train standing.; shunting a heavy coal train was not difficult for these locomotives. With their saddle tanks and internal cylinders, they looked very different from the traditional Dutch shunting locomotives of the NS 8700 and NS 9500 series. In the years between 1953, and 1957 six engines were sold, five to the Laura and Julia coal mine (8811 and 8826 in 1953, 8812 in 1954, 8807 and 8815 in 1957) and one to the United Cooperative Sugar Factories in Roosendaal (8817 in 1955). The remaining engines were scrapped during that time.

== Period after service with the NS ==
After the NS withdrew the engines in 1957, a large number were sold to the Laura and Julia Mine and the Oranje Nassau Mine, where they remained in use until the mines were closed in 1974. The locomotives that were sold to the Staatsmijnen were scrapped in the period 1960–1961. Three engines have been preserved. In 1981 the Stoom Stichting Nederland bought the former NS 8811, built by Hudswell Clarke in 1943. In 2010 this locomotive was partially made roadworthy. On April 13, 2012, the now completely restored locomotive was presented to invited guests at the SSN depot.

The former NS 8826, built by Hunslet in 1944, was bought in 1975 by the Metaalhandel Gebr. van Raak in Tilburg, who loaned the locomotive to the Stichting Stoomtrein Tilburg-Turnhout between 1976 and 1981 for a heritage steam service on the Tilburg - Turnhout railway line. After the line closed the locomotive returned to Tilburg. In 1998 the locomotive was purchased by the Zuid-Limburgse Stoomtrein Maatschappij intending to make it roadworthy again. The boiler of the former NS 8812 on the frame of the former NS 8815 has returned to England, where the locomotive bears the name 'Walkden' and is used on the Ribble Steam Railway.

NS number	WD number	Builder	Build date	Factory Number	Withdrawn	Details
8801	(7)5000	Hunslet	1943	2849	1956	
8802	(7)5001	Hunslet	1943	2850	1956	
8803	(7)5012	Hunslet	1943	2861	1955	
8804	(7)5013	Hunslet	1943	2862	1956	
8805	(7)5020	Hunslet	1943	2869	1956	
8806	(7)5025	Hunslet	1943	2874	1957	
8807	(7)5051	RSH	1943	7087	1957	Sold to the Julia mine in 1957 and numbered LV 17.
8808	(7)5054	RSH	1943	7090	1955	
8809	(7)5059	RSH	1943	7095	1956	
8810	(7)5066	RSH	1943	7102	1956	
8811	(7)5080	Hudswell Clarke	1943	1737	1953	Sold to the Julia mine in 1953 and operated under number Julia IV, renumbered as LV 13 in 1962. Most likely the last operating steam locomotive in the Netherlands. Boiler ticket expired in 1975 and stored in the mines' locomotive shed in Eygelshoven. It has been kept at the Stoom Stichting Nederland since 1980. At the SSN depot and running on open days.
8812	(7)5082	Hudswell Clarke	1943	1739	1954	Sold to the mine Julia IV and numbered LV 15 in 1954. At Laura & Vereeniging in 1970 its boiler was used as a replacement for LV 16 / 8815 and the rest of the loco was scrapped.
8813	(7)5085	Hudswell Clarke	1943	1744	1954	
8814	(7)5098	Hudswell Clarke	1944	1761	1954	
8815	(7)5105	Hunslet	1944	3155	1957	Sold to the Julia mine in 1957 and numbered LV 16. In 1970 it received the boiler of LV 15 / 8812. Sold in 1975 to metal dealer Van Raak in Tilburg, who leased the locomotive to the SSTT as parts supplier for the 8826. Sold in 1988 to a group of English enthusiasts. After passing through both the Northampton Steam Railway and Steamport, it followed most of the Steamport collection to the Ribble Steam Railway in 1999, after which it was restored. This restoration used many parts from the last stocks of the NCB's 'Walkden Yard' workshops, which was commemorated by naming it Walkden afterwards.
8816	(7)5106	Hunslet	1944	3156	1955	
8817	(7)5123	Hunslet	1944	3173	1955	Sold in 1957 to the United Cooperative Sugar Factories in Roosendaal, used there until the end of the sixties. Donated to the Stoomtrein Goes - Borsele in 1970, but scrapped in 1979.
8818	(7)5155	Bagnall	1944	2743	1955	
8819	(7)5157	Bagnall	1944	2745	1955	
8820	(7)5160	Bagnall	1944	2748	1954	
8821	(7)1490	Hudswell Clarke	1944	1766	1954	
8822	(7)5026	Hunslet	1943	2875	1954	
8823	(7)5053	RSH	1943	7089	1955	
8824	(7)5086	Hudswell Clarke	1944	1745	1954	
8825	(7)5104	Hunslet	1944	3154	1956	
8826	(7)5115	Hunslet	1944	3165	1953	Sold in 1953 to the mine Julia and Julia V, renumbered LV 14 in 1962. In 1975 sold to metal dealer Van Raak in Tilburg, who leased the locomotive to the SSTT. Sold in 1998 to the Zuid-Limburgse Stoomtrein Maatschappij
8827	(7)5199	RSH	1944	7149	1954	
