= Harmelen train disaster =

1962 railway accident in the Netherlands

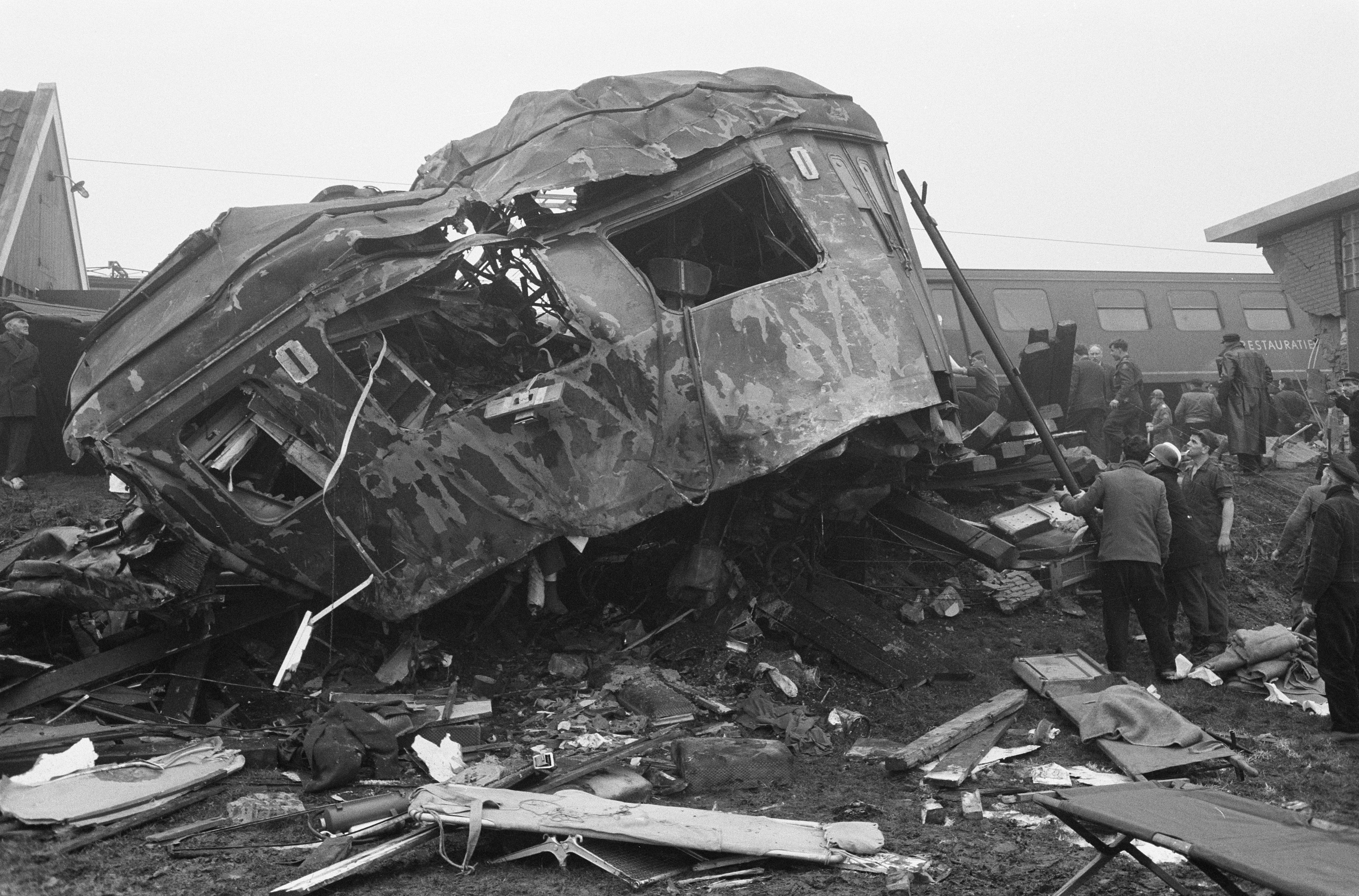
- Aftermath of the disaster

Details
- Date: 8 January 1962; 63 years ago
- Location: Harmelen, Utrecht
- Coordinates: 52°06′17″N 4°57′23″E
- Country: Netherlands
- Operator: Nederlandse Spoorwegen
- Incident type: Head-on collision
- Cause: Signal passed at danger

Statistics
- Trains: 2
- Passengers: ~1,080
- Deaths: 93

The Harmelen train disaster, on 8 January 1962, was the worst railway accident in the history of the Netherlands. Harmelen, in the central Netherlands, is the location of a railway junction where a branch to Amsterdam leaves the Rotterdam to Utrecht line. It is common at high-speed junctions to avoid the use of diamond crossings wherever possible—instead, a ladder crossing is employed where trains destined for the branch line cross over to the track normally employed for trains travelling in the opposite direction for a short distance before taking the branch line.

The accident happened 18 months after the Woerden train accident, the derailment of a British furlough train nearby. Previously, the Weesp train disaster of 1918 had been the worst railway disaster in the Netherlands.

== Collision ==
Shortly before 9.20 a.m. on Monday, 8 January 1962, a foggy day, a Rotterdam to Amsterdam local-train consisting of electric multiple unit Mat '46 sets 700 and 297 was authorised to carry out this manoeuvre, protected by a red signal to stop trains approaching from Utrecht. The EMU was travelling at approximately 75 km/h (47 mph). Simultaneously, an express train from Leeuwarden to Rotterdam, hauled by electric locomotive 1131, was approaching at 107 km/h (67 mph).

Perhaps because of the foggy weather, the driver of the train from Utrecht missed the warning yellow signal and applied the emergency brake when he saw the red signal protecting the junction, far too late to prevent a near head-on collision between the two trains. Six coaches of the Amsterdam train and three on the express train were destroyed.

== Victims ==
Both trains were heavily packed—180 occupants in the six-carriage multiple units and circa 900 aboard the 11-carriage express train, made up of seven recent vehicles and five old Mat '24 trailers. Of approximately 1080 people aboard the trains, 93 lost their lives, including the drivers of both trains.

== Aftermath ==
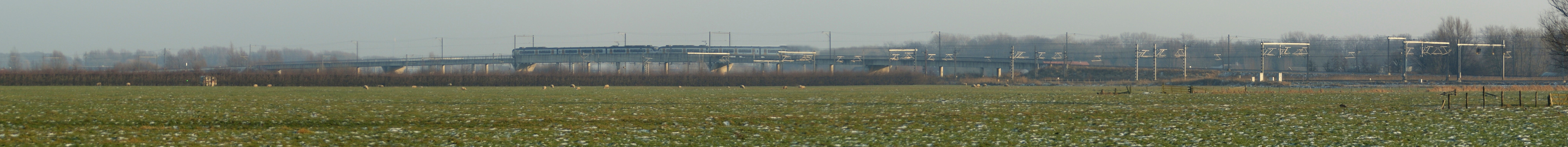
The current flyover, near the site of the accident

The collision spurred the installation on Dutch railways of the system of automatic train protection known as Automatische treinbeïnvloeding (ATB), which automatically overrides the driver in such a "signal passed at danger" situation.

The junction was later rebuilt as a flying junction in the 1990s.

== Memorial ==
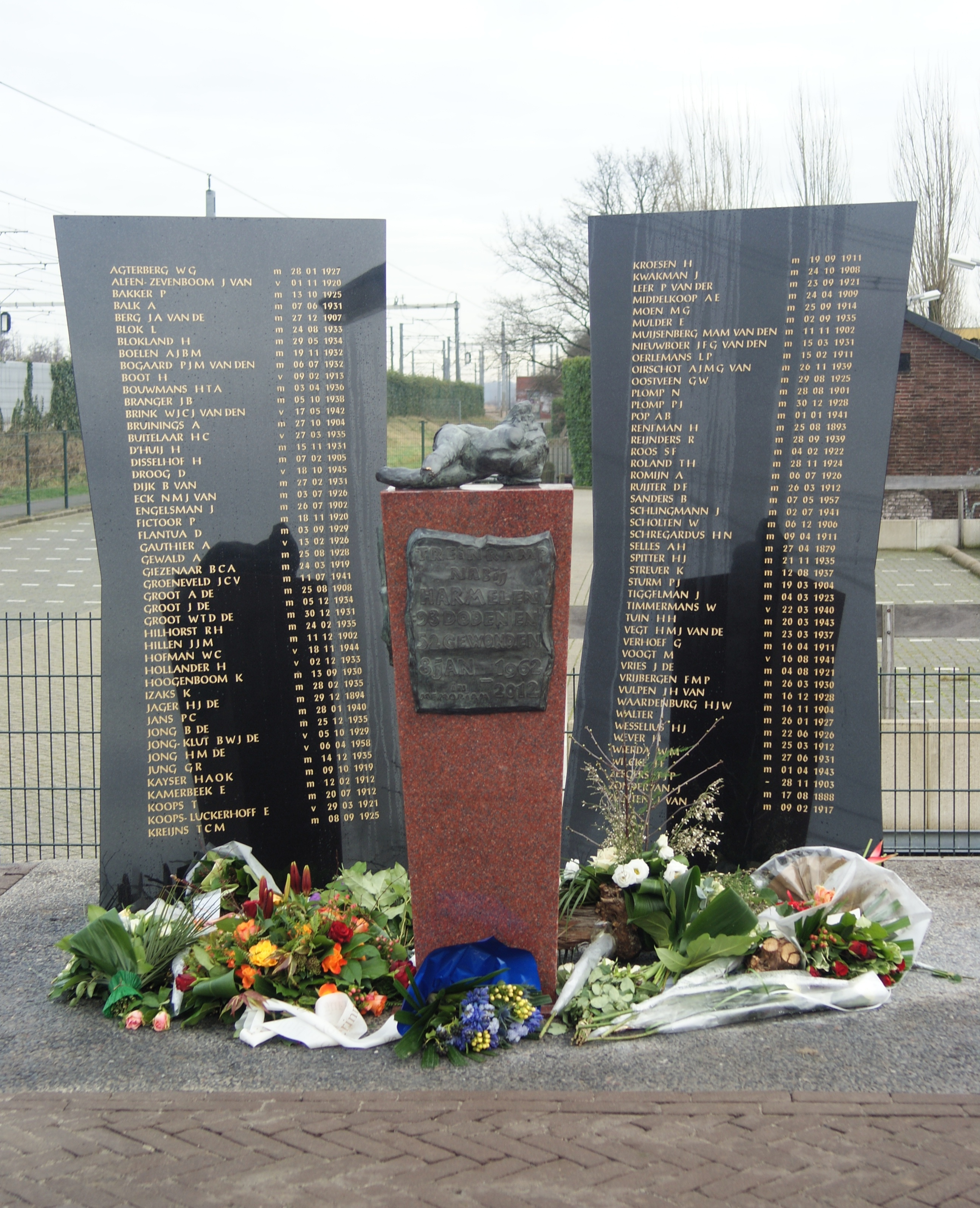
Memorial to victims of the Harmelen train disaster

On 8 January 2012, Pieter van Vollenhoven unveiled a memorial for the victims of the disaster, which on that day had taken place exactly 50 years earlier. The organization of the disclosure was owned by the local "Dorpsplatform" Harmelen.

The monument was designed by Taeke Friso de Jong, an artist from Kamerik. The mason was Maurice van Dam from Woerden. The design consists of two stone slabs that are tilted relative to each other and contain the names of the 93 victims. Looking through the two slabs discloses the actual spot where the collision happened. A red stone plinth, bearing a body that represents the victims, is placed in the middle in front of the two slabs. Three names on the slabs were spelled incorrectly; the names are copied from contemporary handwritten police reports. The mistakes have since been corrected.

== Similar accidents ==
- 1976 Schiedam train accident (South Holland, Netherlands)
- Beresfield rail disaster (New South Wales, Australia)
- Violet Town railway disaster (Victoria, Australia)

== See also ==
- Train stops
