= Harmelen =

- Town
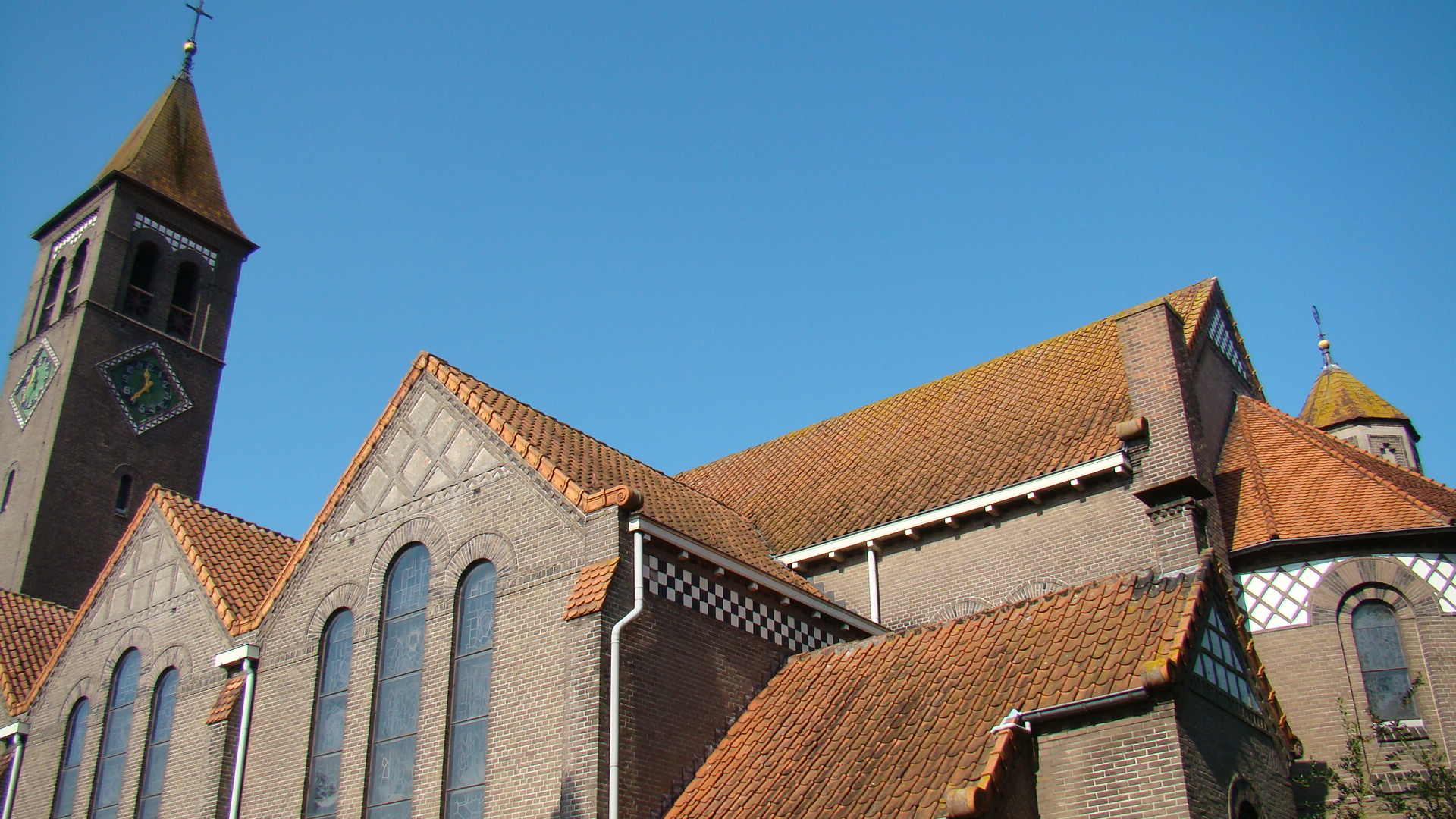
- Catholic church in Harmelen, designed by Jan Stuyt

- Flag Coat of arms

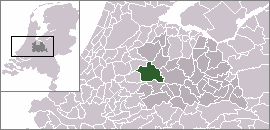

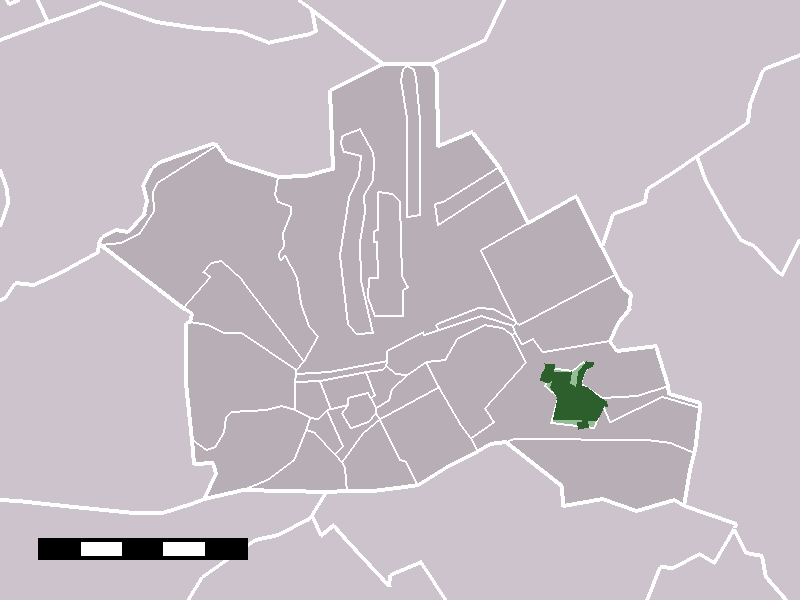
- Harmelen in the municipality of Woerden.
- Coordinates: 52°5′22″N 4°57′39″E
- Country: Netherlands
- Province: Utrecht
- Municipality: Woerden

Area
  - Total: 23.75 km^{2} (9.17 sq mi)

Population (1 January 2010)
  - Total: 8,374
  - Density: 352.6/km^{2} (913.2/sq mi)
- Time zone: UTC+1 (CET)
  - Summer (DST): UTC+2 (CEST)

Harmelen is a town in the Dutch province of Utrecht. It is a part of the municipality of Woerden, and lies about 6 km east of Woerden.

In 2001, the town of Harmelen had 6557 inhabitants. The built-up area of the town was 1.11 km², and contained 2481 residences.

Harmelen is on the railway line between Utrecht and Woerden; its train station was opened on 21 May 1855 and closed on 15 May 1936. In 1962, two passenger trains collided near Harmelen. The Harmelen train disaster, resulting in 93 fatalities, was the largest train accident in Dutch history.

The village used to be a separate municipality, until it merged with Woerden in 2001. Before the merger the municipality of Harmelen had about 8000 inhabitants.

== Notable people born in Harmelen ==
- Ellen van Dijk, (born 1987) – professional racing cyclist
- Dico Koppers, (born 1992) – soccerplayer by Ajax
- Theo de Rooij, (born 1957) – former racing cyclist and manager of the Rabobank cycling team
- James Cornelius van Miltenburg, (born 1909) – first Archbishop of Karachi
