= Hunslet Austerity 0-6-0ST =

Class of steam locomotive

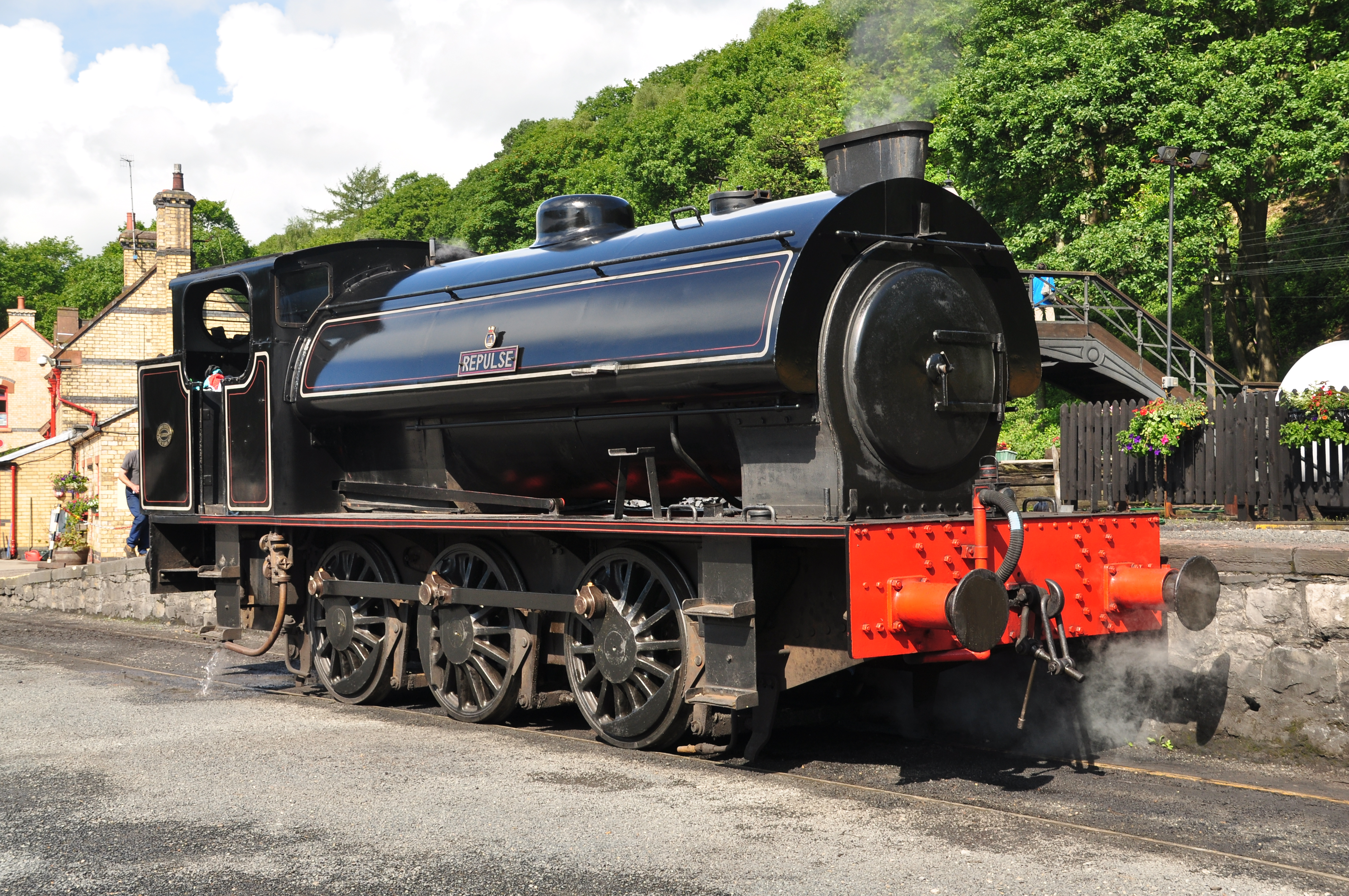
- Austerity No. 3698 Repulse at the Lakeside and Haverthwaite Railway
Type and origin
- Power type: Steam
- Designer: Hunslet Engine Company
- Builder: Hunslet Engine Company, Andrew Barclay Sons & Co. (15), W. G. Bagnall (52), Hudswell Clarke (50), Robert Stephenson and Hawthorns (90), Vulcan Foundry (50)
- Build date: 1943–1964
- Total produced: 485
Specifications
- Configuration
  - Whyte: 0-6-0ST
  - UIC: Cn t
- Gauge: 4 ft 8 1/2 in (1,435 mm) standard gauge
- Driver dia.: 4 ft 3 in (1.295 m)
- Minimum curve: 180 ft (54.86 m)
- Wheelbase: 11 ft 0 in (3.35 m)
- Length: 30 ft 4 in (9.25 m)
- Axle load: 13 long tons 7 cwt (29,900 lb or 13.6 t)
- Loco weight: 48 long tons 5 cwt (108,100 lb or 49 t)
- Fuel type: Coal
- Fuel capacity: 2 long tons 5 cwt (5,000 lb or 2.3 t)
- Water cap.: 1,200 imp gal (5,500 L; 1,400 US gal)
- Firebox
  - Grate area: 16.8 sq ft (1.56 m^{2})
- Boiler: Round top outer firebox, 181 tubes, copper or steel inner firebox
- Boiler pressure: 170 psi (1.17 MPa)
- Heating surface
  - Firebox: 88 sq ft (8.2 m^{2})
  - Tubes: 873 sq ft (81.1 m^{2})
- Superheater: None
- Cylinders: Two, inside
- Cylinder size: 18 in × 26 in (457 mm × 660 mm)
- Valve gear: Stephenson
- Valve type: Slide valves
Performance figures
- Tractive effort: 23,870 lbf (106.18 kN)
Career
- Power class: BR: 4F
- Nicknames: Austerity
- Retired: 1959–1984
- Disposition: 70 preserved, remainder scrapped

The Hunslet Austerity 0-6-0ST is a class of steam locomotive designed by Hunslet Engine Company for shunting. The class became the standard British shunting locomotive during the Second World War, and production continued until 1964 at various locomotive manufacturers.

== Background ==
The 48150 class were built for the Guest Keen Baldwins Iron & Steel Company in 1937, being an enlarged version of a design dating from 1923. These developed into the 50550 class of 1941–42, with various modifications.

At the outbreak of the Second World War, the War Department had initially chosen the LMS 'Jinty' 3F 0-6-0T as its standard shunting locomotive, but was persuaded by Hunslet that a simplified version of their more modern 50550 design would be more suitable. The first locomotive was completed at their Leeds works at the start of 1943.

== Construction ==
Hunslet subcontracted some of the construction to Andrew Barclay Sons & Co., W. G. Bagnall, Hudswell Clarke, Robert Stephenson and Hawthorns and the Vulcan Foundry in order to meet delivery requirements.

After D-Day, they were used on Continental Europe and in North Africa, as well as at docks and military sites in Britain.

A total of 377 had been built for the War Department by 1947 (on orders placed during the war), with two further engines having been built for collieries (without the permission of the Ministry of Supply). When the end of the war reduced the need for locomotives, the military started to review its fleet:

- 90 locomotives were kept by the military for use on their railways.
- 75 locomotives were sold to the LNER and classified as J94.
- 27 that had been loaned to Nederlandse Spoorwegen were sold to that company in 1947, becoming the NS 8800 class.
- 11 were loaned to the Nederlandsche Staatsmijnen, who bought 9 of them.

Others were sold for industrial use. A number of those used on the continent are believed to have worked on light and industrial railways in France, six going to the Chemins de Fer Tunisiens in 1946.

== Post-war construction ==
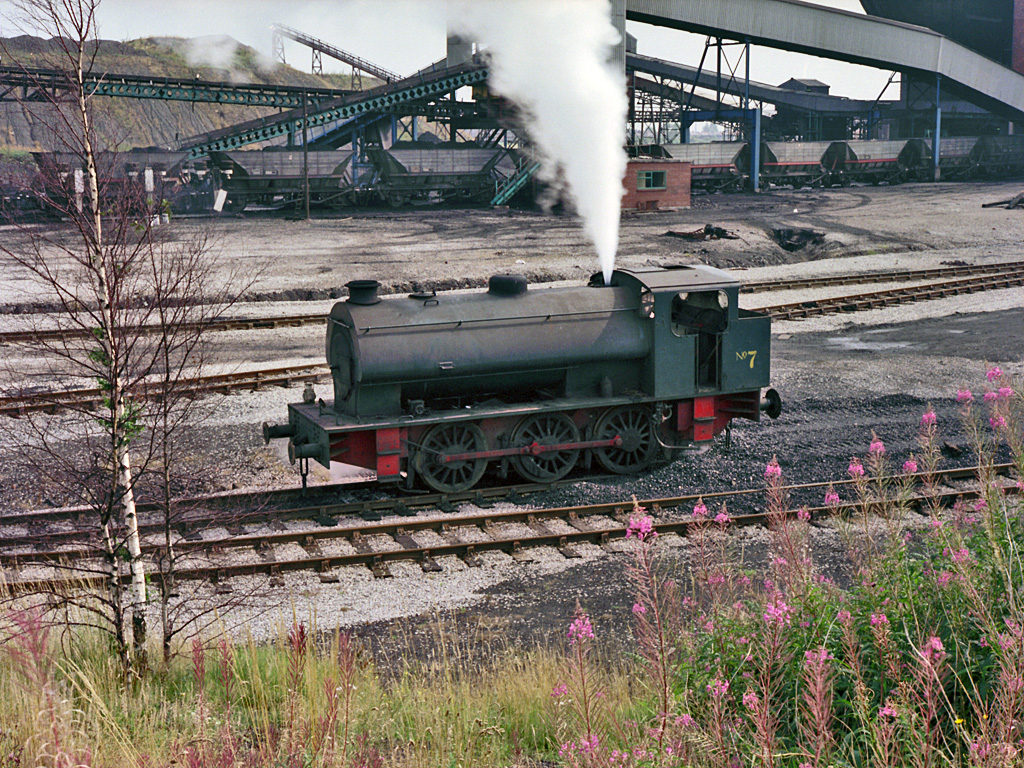
Austerity at Bickershaw Colliery, Greater Manchester

As the final War Department locomotives were being delivered, the National Coal Board was placing orders for identical locomotives to be used at their collieries. Between 1948 and 1964, 77 new "Austerity" locomotives were built for the NCB. A further fourteen engines were ordered in 1952 by the British Army to supplement its 90 existing engines.

The Yorkshire Engine Company also built eight locomotives to this design in 1954 for use in ironstone quarries and at Scunthorpe Steelworks. It has been suggested, although it has not been proven, that Hunslet sold some of the parts for the eight "Austerities" to the Yorkshire Engine Company as part of a subcontract settlement for the GWR 9400 Class 0-6-0PT, ordered by the GWR from Hunslet and partially subcontracted to the Yorkshire Engine Company.

Hunslet rebuilt many NCB locomotives and when the Army started to sell off locomotives again in 1959, they bought 15 examples that were to be rebuilt and sold on. The NCB bought 13 of these, the 14th was sold directly into preservation and the final locomotive was scrapped without being rebuilt. Ultimately from first to last, a total of 485 examples were constructed between 1943 and 1964.

The NCB continued to use Austerities in the 1970s and a small number remained in service until the early 1980s, notably at Bickershaw Colliery, Greater Manchester. Some of the examples that survived the longest were those fitted with mechanical stokers and Kylpor blast pipes or Giesl ejectors to improve their performance and reduce smoke.

== Preservation ==
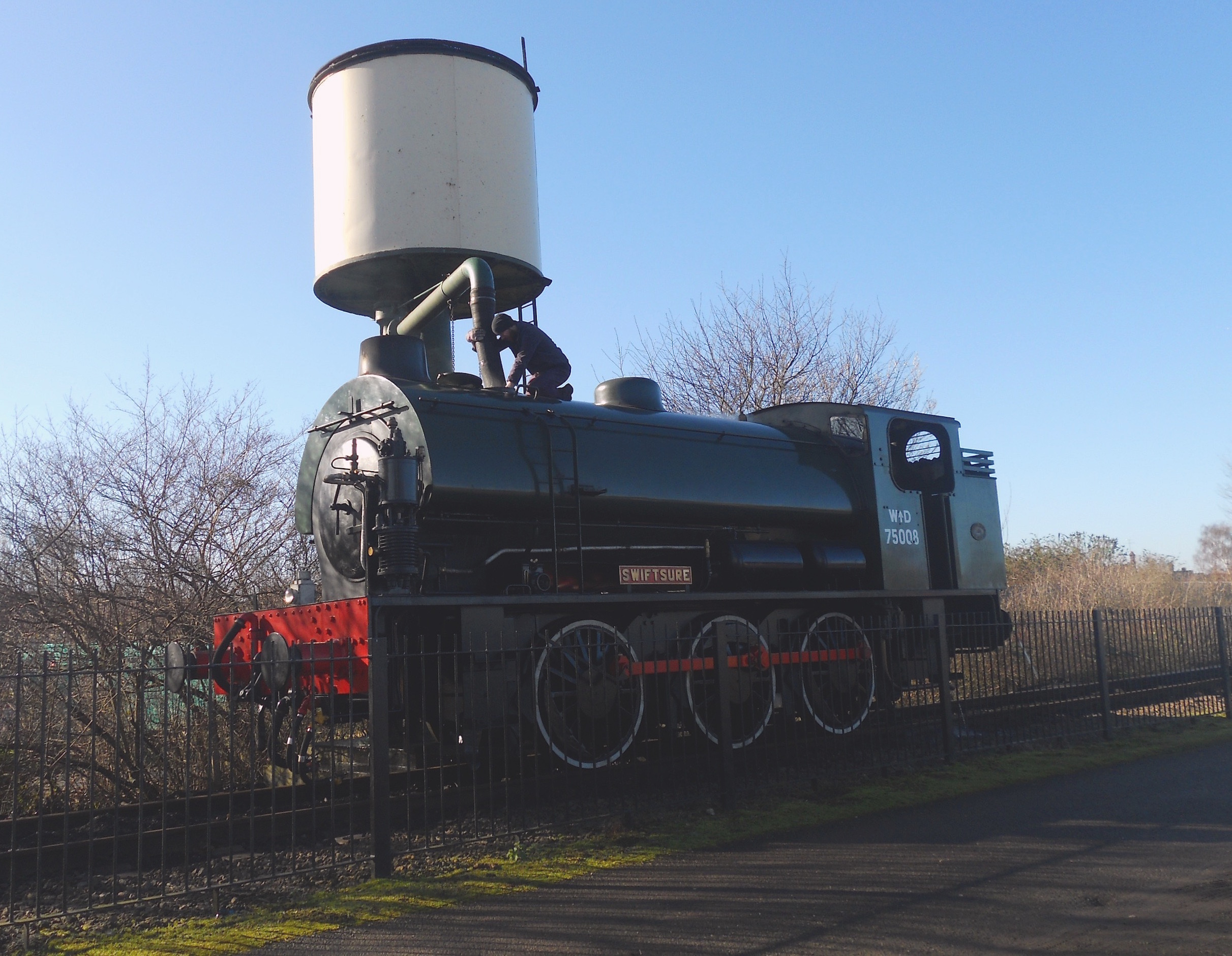
Hunslet 0-6-0ST Austerity WD75008 takes on water from the water tower at Peterborough Nene Valley on the Nene Valley Railway

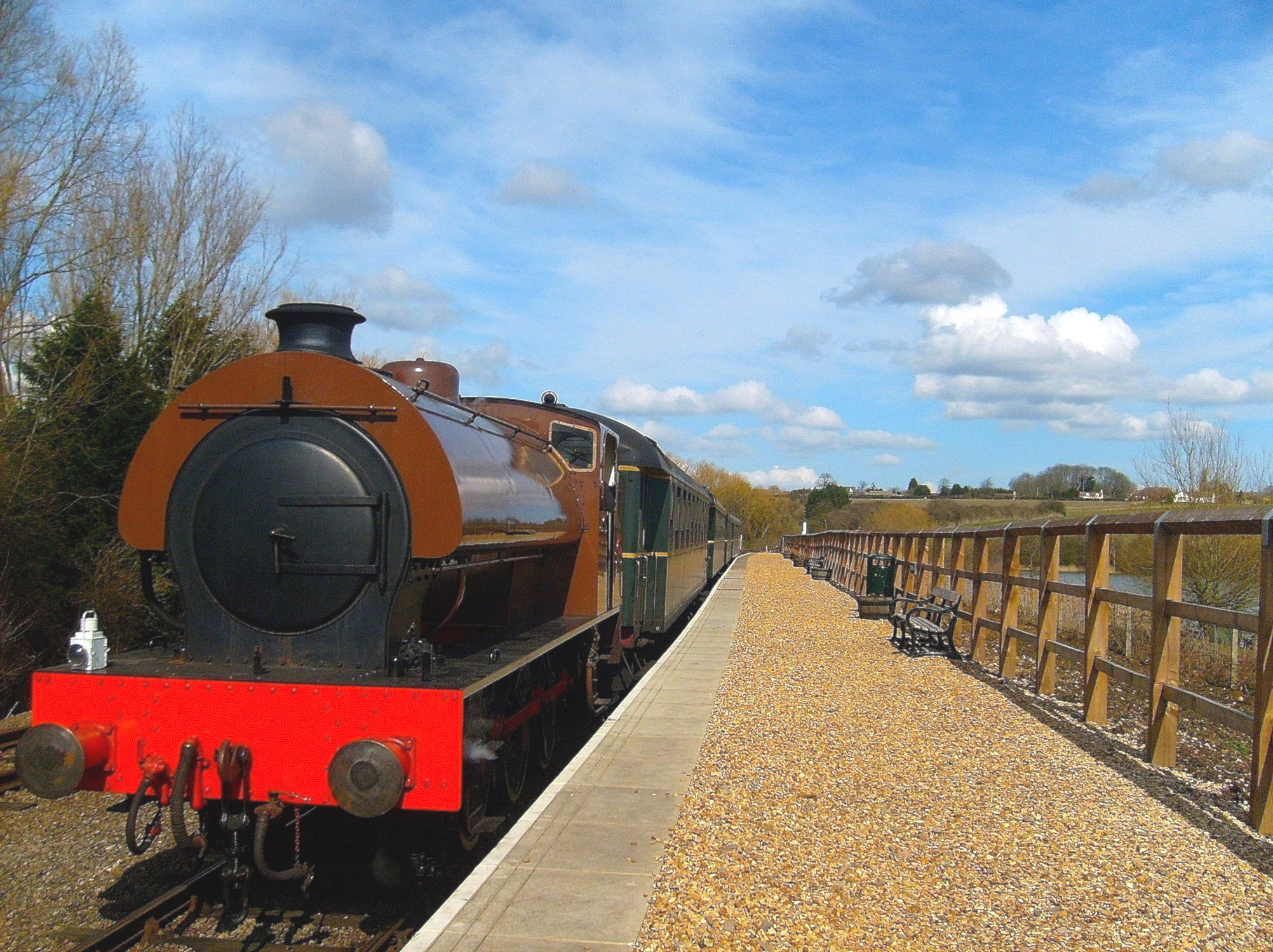
Barclay 0-6-0ST Austerity WPR No. 15 and its train are seen at Yarwell on the Nene Valley Railway

Seventy Austerities have been preserved on heritage railways, many in working order. Several have been painted as LNER Class J94s to represent mainline rather than industrial use. During the "Rocket 150" celebrations in 1979, NCB Bold Colliery "Austerity" No. 7 Robert also participated in the cavalcade of locomotives at Rainhill. Enthusiasts often refer to them by the nickname of "Bucket".

Not all have survived intact; the boiler of RSH 7135 of 1944 was used on the replica broad gauge locomotive "Iron Duke" built at the National Railway Museum in 1985. A former Hunslet Austerity at the Watercress Line has been rebuilt from an 0-6-0ST into a 0-6-0T Thomas the Tank Engine lookalike, and another one into Douglas, also from The Railway Series.

== Models ==
The Hunslet "Austerity" was produced as a model by Kitmaster from 1961 onwards in 00 gauge. The Kitmaster toolings were sold to Airfix in 1962 and later Dapol in 1981 when Airfix stopped production of model railway items; Dapol continued to use the Kitmaster toolings until they were destroyed by a fire at Dapol's Winsford headquarters in 1994. Dapol also produced a ready-to-run model of these locomotives; this tooling was sold in 1996 to Hornby who have continued to produce the "Austerity" as both the J94 class and in various industrial liveries.

Graham Farish and subsequently Bachmann have produced the "Austerity" as the LNER/BR J94 class for N gauge.

DJmodels also produced J94 and austerity tanks in 00 gauge in a variety of liveries including BR as well as several industrial liveries. This model has since become part of the EFE Rail range.

== Bibliography ==
- "Austerity Saddle Tank Locomotives". Industrial Railway Record. 18 (203). London: Industrial Railway Society. December 2010. ISBN 978-1901556643.
- Gamble, H.A. (1969). "The 18in Hunslets". Industrial Railway Record. 3 (23): 2–16.
- Hunslet Engine Co.; Neale, Andrew (2006). Hunslet Austerity Locomotives Spare Parts List (2nd ed.). Somerset, UK: Camden Miniature Steam Services. ISBN 978-0954713140.
- Lambert, A. P. & Woods, J. C. (1991). Continent, Coalfield and Conservation — The Biographical History of the British Army Austerity 0-6-0 Saddle Tank. Industrial Railway Society. ISBN 0-901096-63-6.
- Tourret, R. (1995). Allied Military Locomotives of the Second World War. Abingdon, Oxon: Tourret Publishing. pp. 103–111. ISBN 0-905878-06-X.
- Townsley, Don (September–October 1988). "The Hunslet 'Austerity' 0-6-0STs". Locomotives Illustrated (61). Ian Allan Ltd. ISSN 0307-1804.
- Nock, O.S. (2009). British Steam Railways. Bounty Books. ISBN 978-0753717851.
