= Mat '24 =

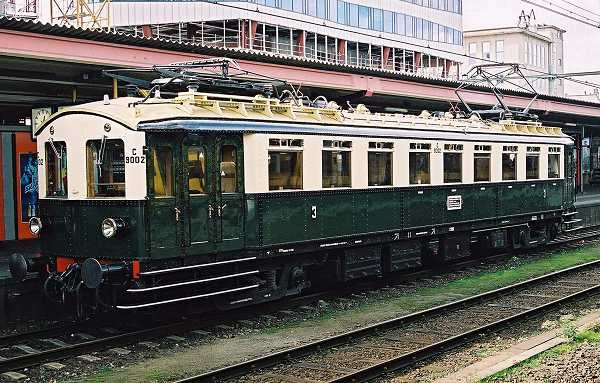
- Blokkendoos mC 9002 'Jaap'
Type and origin
- Power type: Electric
- Builder: Werkspoor, HAWA, Beijnes, Görlitz
- Build date: 1924–1933
- Total produced: 261
Specifications
- Gauge: 1,435 mm (4 ft 8 1/2 in)
Performance figures
- Power output: 662 kW (888 hp) per motor carriage
Career
- Operators: NS
- Withdrawn: Most at the end of 1959, Most carriages by 1972 and the last unit in 1992

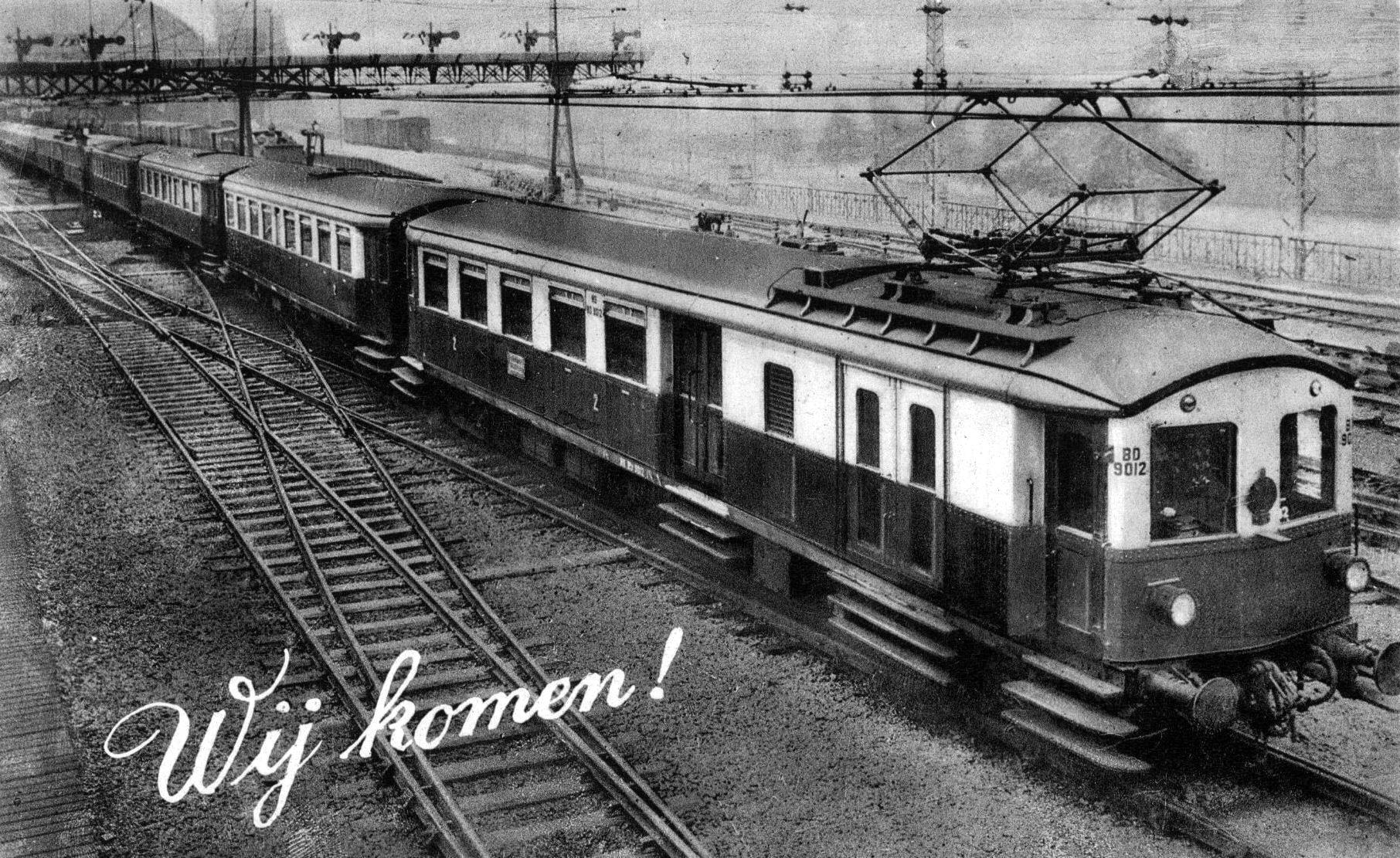
Electric train of the NS of the type Mat '24 at Amsterdam CS; circa 1927. Motor carriage BD 9012 at the front. Collection of Het Utrecht Archief.

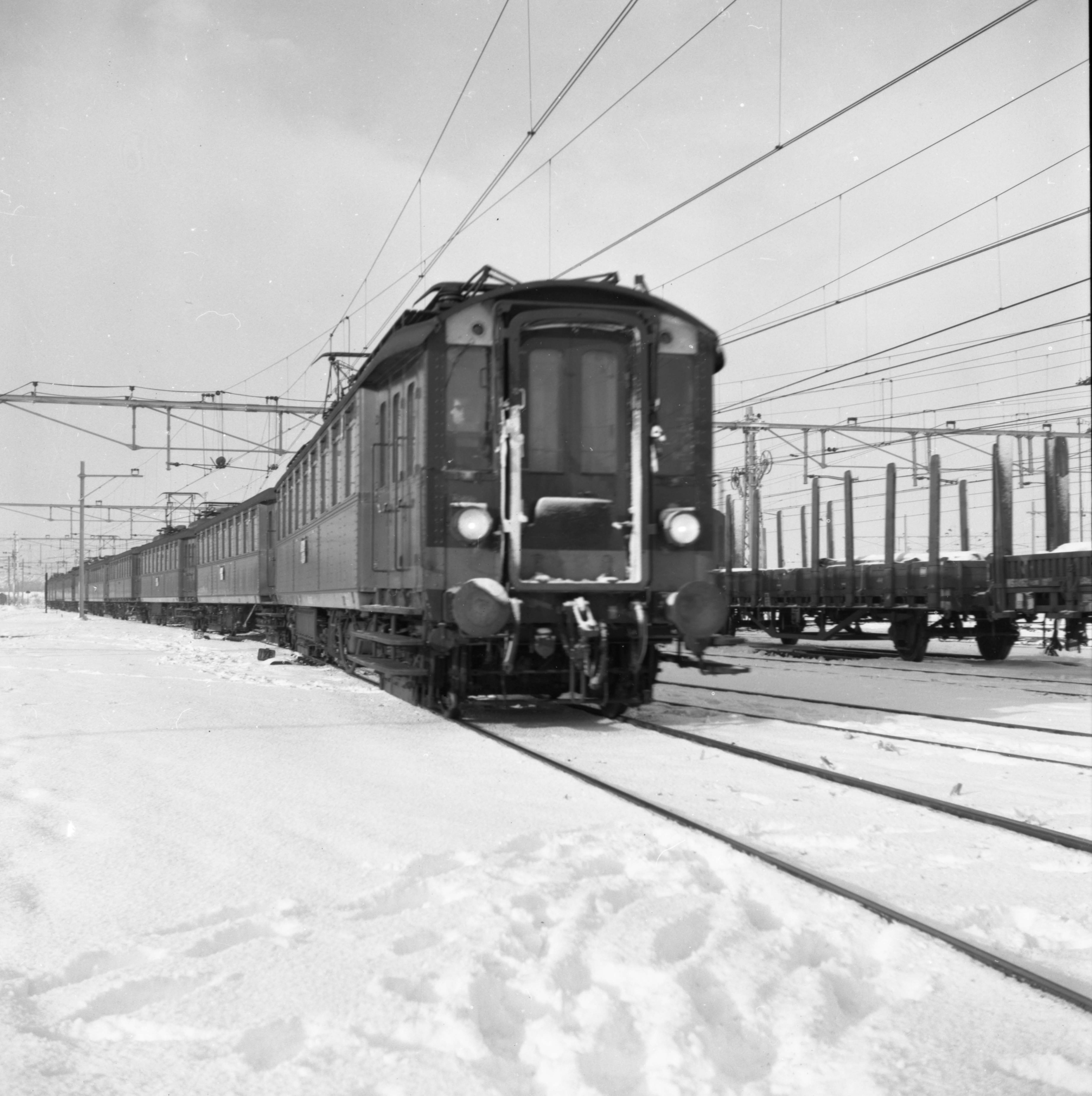
Electric train type Mat '24 with a control carriage at the front in Utrecht C.S.; 23 January 1958.

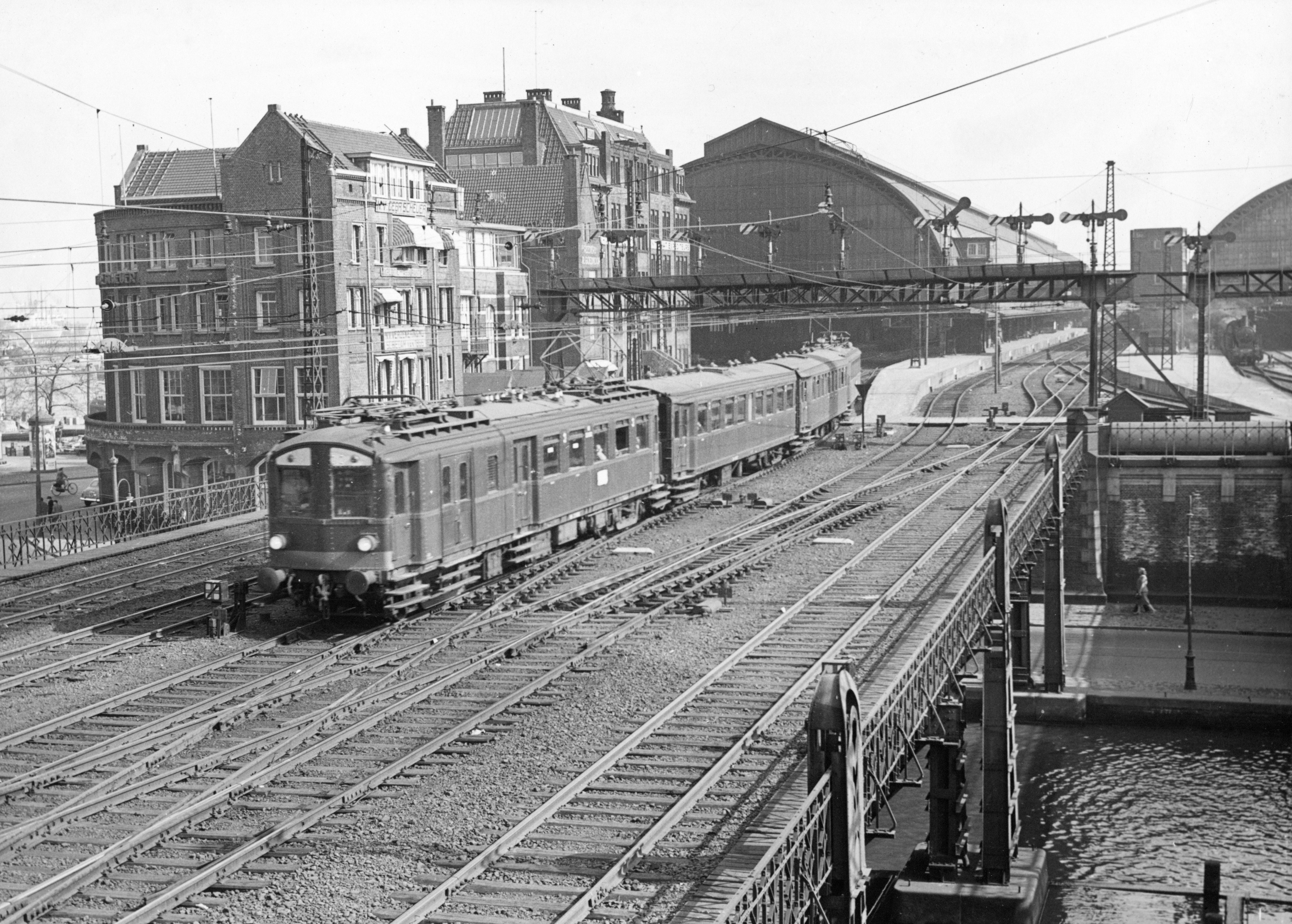
Train consisting of buffer stock ('blokkendozen', mat '24) at Amsterdam Central Station; 1953.

The Mat '24 was a series of electric multiple units and railcars of the Dutch Railways. After the arrival of electric streamline units in 1935, the name of this equipment became Blokkendozen (Block Boxes), after the angular model. Some NS employees and those interested in the railway invariably spoke of "(electric) buffer equipment", to distinguish it from the streamlined, bufferless electric multiple units of the types Mat '35, Mat '36 and Mat '40.

The design of this equipment in 1924 made use of the experience gained with the first electrical equipment in the Netherlands, the ZHESM equipment from 1908, which was used on the Rotterdam Hofplein – Scheveningen (Hofplein line) railway line.

== Characteristics ==
The combinations were more or less fixed, formed with motor carriages and intermediate carriages, usually consisting of two motor carriages in a train circuit and two or three intermediate carriages. The motor carriages were initially equipped with a driving position on one side. To increase the availability, motor vehicles were later also delivered that were equipped with folding bellows, with a cab (small by contemporary standards) next to it.

Due to the presence of buffers and screw couplings, this equipment could also be used in pulled trains. Conversely, other types of carriages, if equipped with controls, could also be used in blokkendoos trains. This was the case from 15 May 1928 onwards in trains on the Oude Lijn, which included CIWL dining cars.

== Composition and numbering ==
The Blokkendozen are electrical buffer units and consist of a large number of different types of motor vehicles and support vehicles. The total number of blokkendozen produced is 259. Below is an overview of these different subseries:

=== Original variants ===
Designation	Amount	Series	Model	Notes
mBD	30	9001–9030	Motor carriage 2nd class (40 seats) with luggage compartment.	
mCd	47	9401–9447	Motor carriage 3rd class (88 seats) with a driving position and passage on one side	
mC	38	9001–9038	Motor carriage 3rd class (88 seats) with a driving position on one side, without passage.	
mABD	4	9001–9004	Motor carriage 1st and 2nd class with extra luggage compartment	Built for working on the Haarlem – IJmuiden Line
mBD	11	9151–9161	Motor carriage 2nd class (32 seats) with extra luggage space	
Aec	27	8501–8527	Intermediate carriage, 1st class (42 seats)	
Bec	33	8501–8533	Intermediate carriage 2nd class (64 seats)	The 8503 – 8512 are the former B 7501 – 7510, the first series of all-steel carriages of the NS, built as a pilot for international service.
Cec	55	8501–8555	Intermediate carriage 3rd class (88 seats)	
ABec	11	8501–8511	Intermediate carriage 1st and 2nd class with central entry balcony	Built for the Amsterdam-Rotterdam line
Ces	3	8101–8103	Control carriage 3rd class (88 seats) with walk-through option	Built for working on the Haarlem – IJmuiden Line

=== Remodelling in the 1930s ===
In the 1930s, some renovations were carried out on Mat '24, so the equipment could cope better with the transport needs of the time. The white-green livery of the trains was changed to green, as it was less contagious to dirt.

New designation	Old designation	Amount	Series	rebuilding
ABec	Aec	4	8521–8524	Rebuilding from only 1st class, to 1st and 2nd class
Bec	Aec	3	8525–8527	Rebuilding from 1st to 2nd class
Ce8c	Bec	10	8522–8531	Rebuilding from 2nd to 3rd class

=== Conversion into drawn carriages and separate service carriages ===
After the last Blokkendoos was used as electrical buffer unit in 1959, the role of the various (motor) carriages on the railway network was not yet over. Gradually in the 1950s a large part of the equipment was painted blue and used as drawn carriages. The engines and pantographs were removed from the motor carriages. Carriages were used in various passenger trains. In addition, the carriages were used in military leave trains.

New designation	Old designation	Amount	Series
AB	ABecm	9	5611–5619
A	Aec	20	5001–5008, 5501–5512
AB	Bec	13	5101–5111, 5601–5602
B	Bec/Ce8C	8	5201–5208
B	Cec	45	5211–5241, 5701–5714
Bz	Ces	2	5301–5302
Bz	mCd	36	5831–5866
Bz	mC	51	5801–5851
BDz	mBD	8	5901–5908

In addition to the conversion of numerous carriages and some motor carriages into drawn carriages, some motor carriages with luggage compartments were converted into service carriages for the NS (mDW) and the PTT (Motorposten). The service carriages were used, among other things, for training drivers, ATB measuring carriage and as rail grinding carriage. With the commissioning of 35 new Motorposts in 1965, the Blokkendoos motorposts were taken out of service.

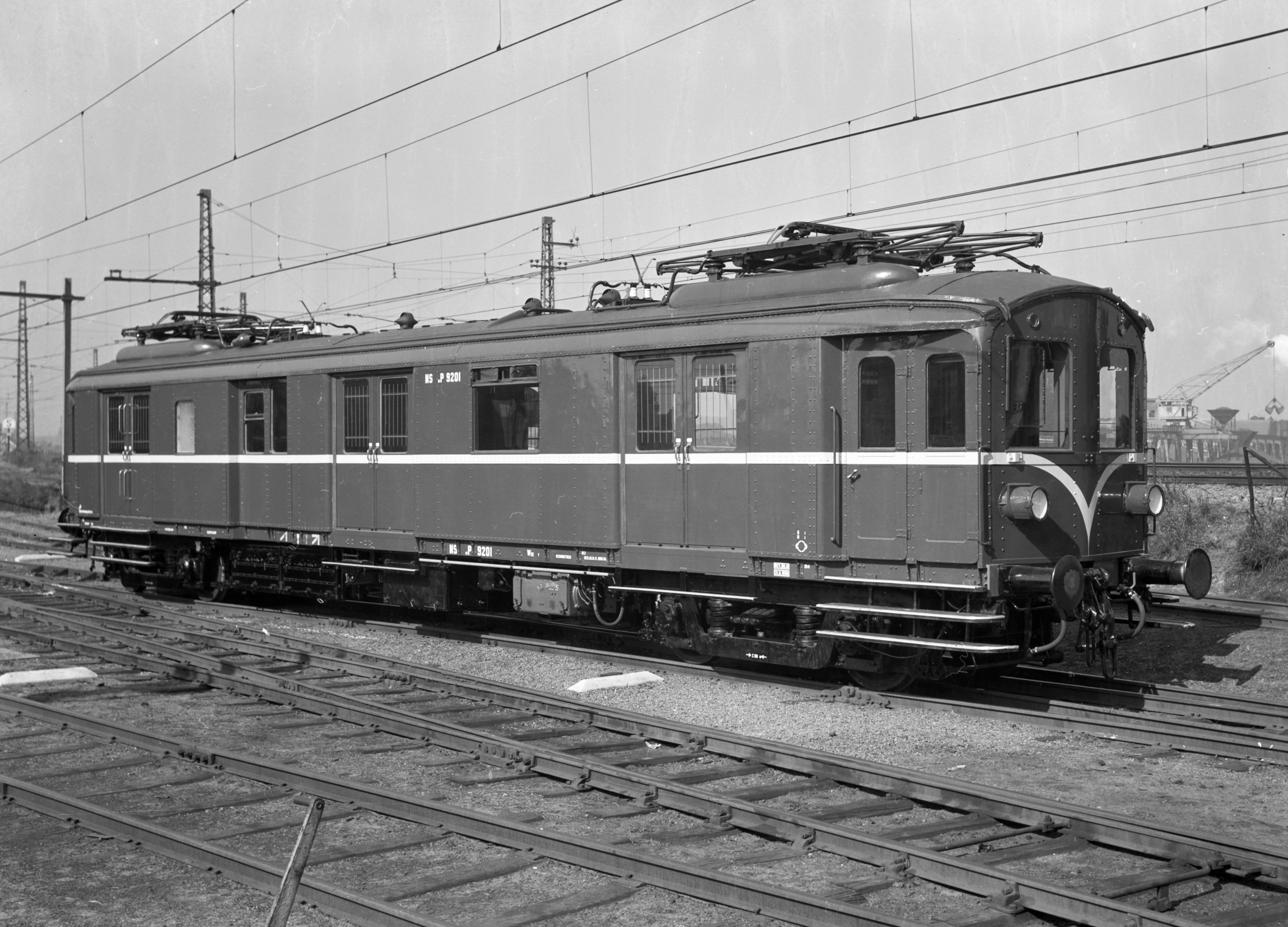
Motor post carriage 9201 shortly after the renovation in Haarlem; 24 September 1956.

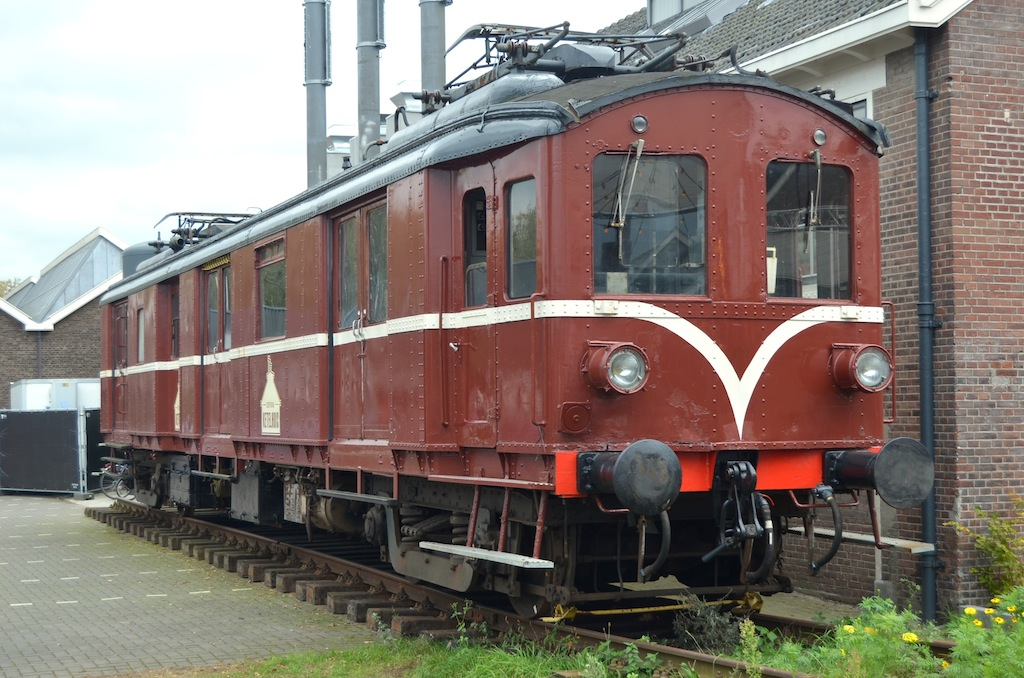
The mBD 9006 'Jules' at the Wagonworkshop Amersfoort during the railparade in Amersfoort.

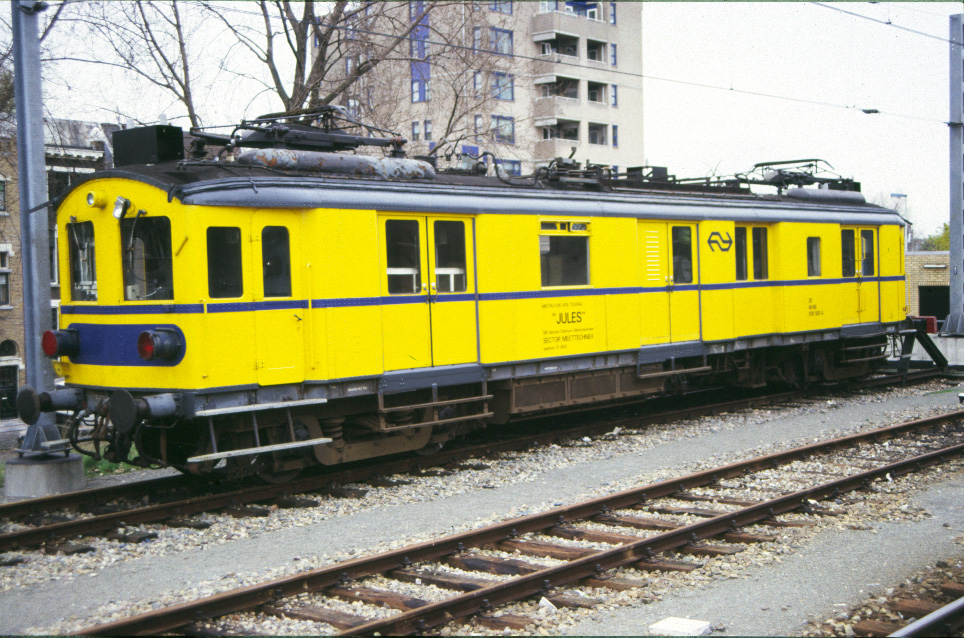
Motor service carriage Jules (ex-mBD 9006) in Rotterdam.

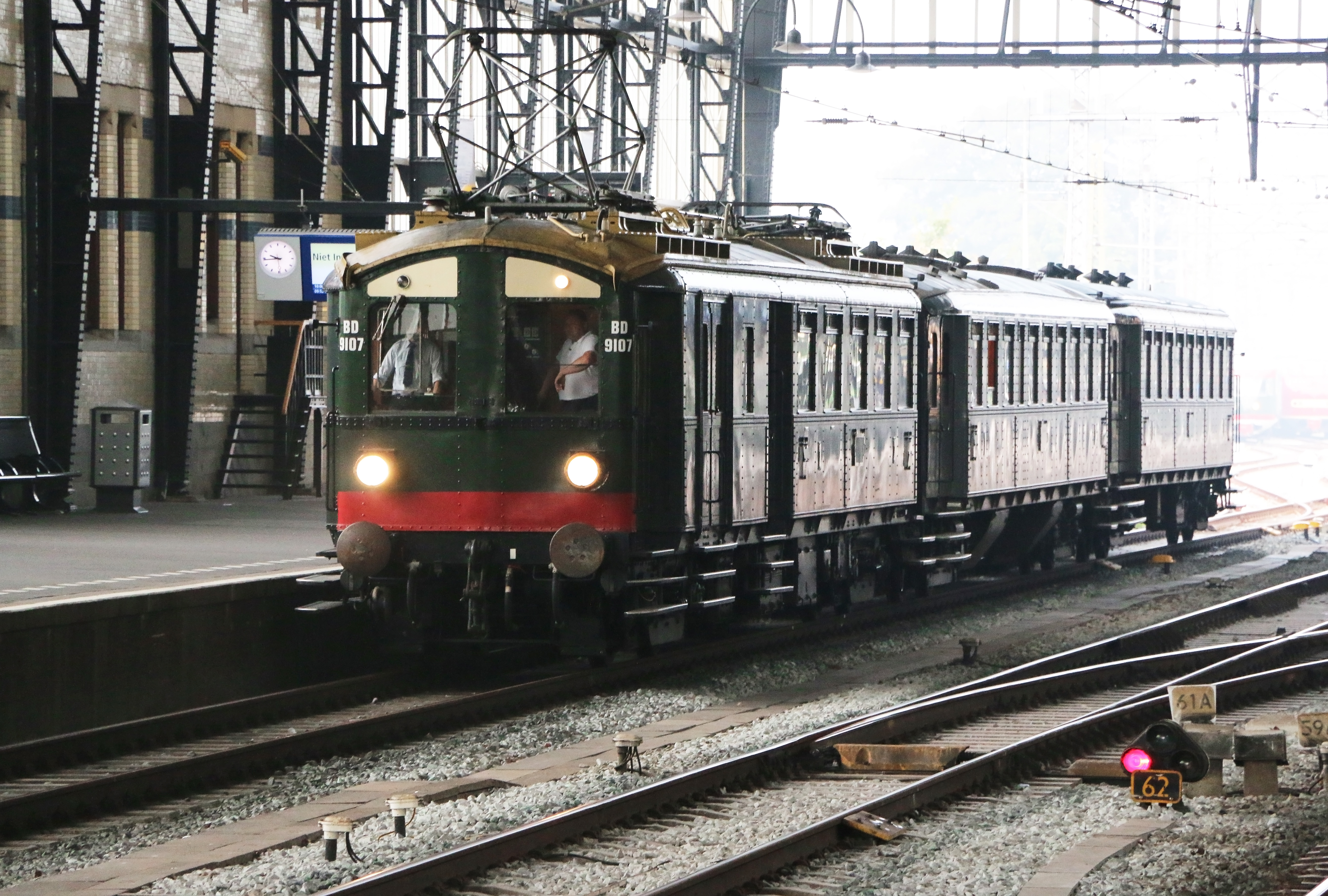
Blokkendozen unit at Haarlem railway station.

New designation	Old designation	Amount	Series
mP	mBD/mCD	13	9201–9213
mP	mB4D	8	9221–9228
mP	mABD	4	9231–9234
mDW	mC	5	169306–169310

== In service ==
The mat '24 was initially intended to be used on the Amsterdam – Rotterdam (Old Line) railway line, which was electrified in 1924–'27. In addition, the IJmond line was electrified in 1927. Over time, the mat '24 could be seen on a large part of the electrified network.

=== Service before 1931 ===
Until the electrification of the Zaan line in 1931, a total of 193 carriages were available. These carriages were assembled in the following order:

- 6 7-multiple units mBD + Bec + Bec + Aec + mCd + Cec + mC
- 11 6-multiple units mBD + Bec + Aec + mCd + Cec + mC
- 11 8-multiple units mBD + Bec + Aec + mCd + Cec + mC (of which 2 reserve trains)
- 4 3-multiple units mBD + CeC + mC (IJmond line)

=== Service after 1931 ===
In 1931 there was another delivery in connection with the electrification of the Amsterdam – Alkmaar (Zaanlijn) railway line. Between 1923 and 1932 a total of 130 motor carriages and 129 intermediate carriages were delivered by various factories.

=== Service during WW2 ===
The NS had no electric locomotives in service during the Second World War, although contacts with suppliers were already underway and after the war resulted in the 1000 series. In the summer of 1940 there were shortages of steam locomotives for pulling goods trains. Because diesel trains were taken out of service due to a fuel shortage, lack of materials in the workshops, mandatory maintenance of steam locomotives of the Deutsche Reichsbahn and increased transport, more locomotives were needed. Five formations of three motor carriages were made of the Blokkendozen stock for pulling heavy goods trains on the Middennet and the Old Line. With this, the heavy coal trains from the mines in Limburg could be transported to Eindhoven and the west of the Netherlands. In 1942, due to a severe winter and a consequent high defect rate, the shortage of locomotives increased to such an extent that the number of combinations was increased by eight.

== Withdrawal ==
In the mid-fifties, most of the motor carriages were converted into drawn carriages. In 1959 the Blokkendoos trains were used for passenger transport. The last drawn Blokkendoos carriages ran in a passenger trains in 1972. Subsequently, various carriages were sold to heritage lines, including the Veluwsche Stoomtrein Maatschappij (VSM), the Stoomtrein Goes-Borsele (SGB) and the Zuid limburgse Stoomtrein Maatschapij (ZLSM).

== Second life ==
=== Germany ===
After the Second World War, several carriages were left behind in the Eastern Bloc. In the 1980s and 1990s, various blokkendoos were found in the former DDR.

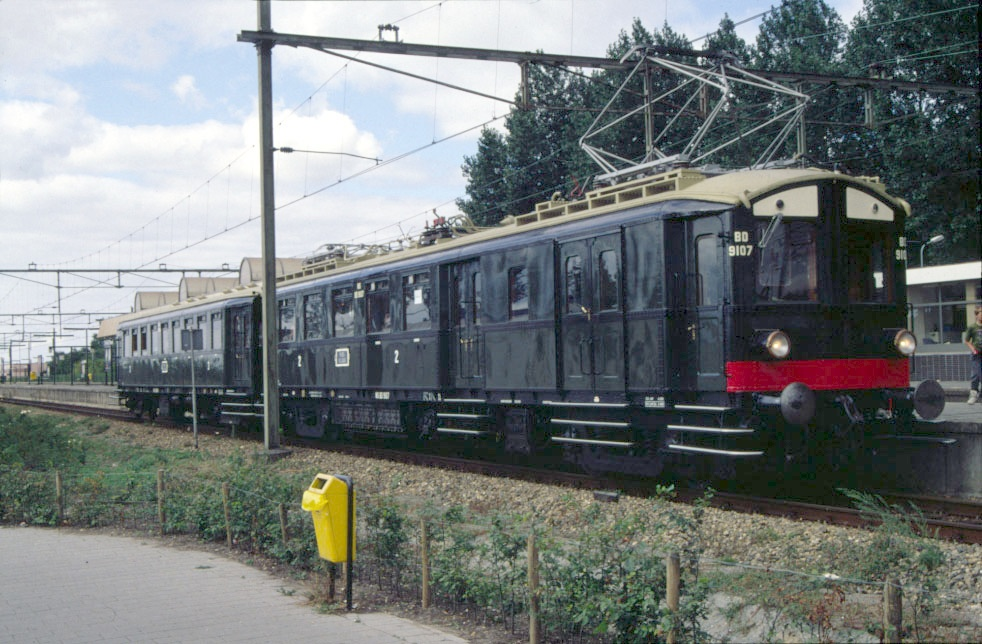
Two carriage set mBD 9107 and Ces 8104 in Heerhugowaard.

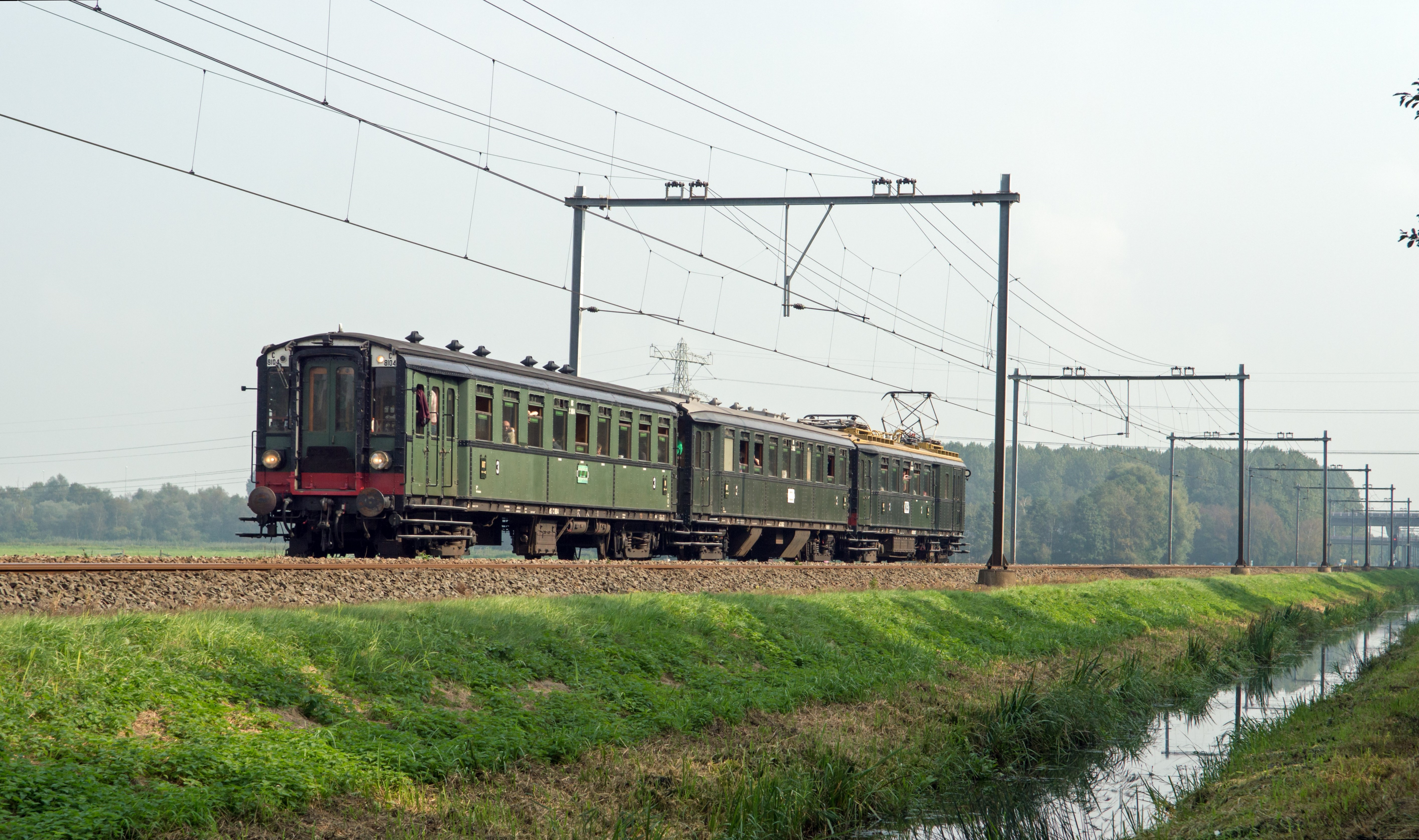
Museum blokkendoos train with control carriage Ces 8104 at the front, the Cec 8553 as the middle carriage and motor carriage mBD 9107 at the rear, between Halfweg and Spaarnwoude.

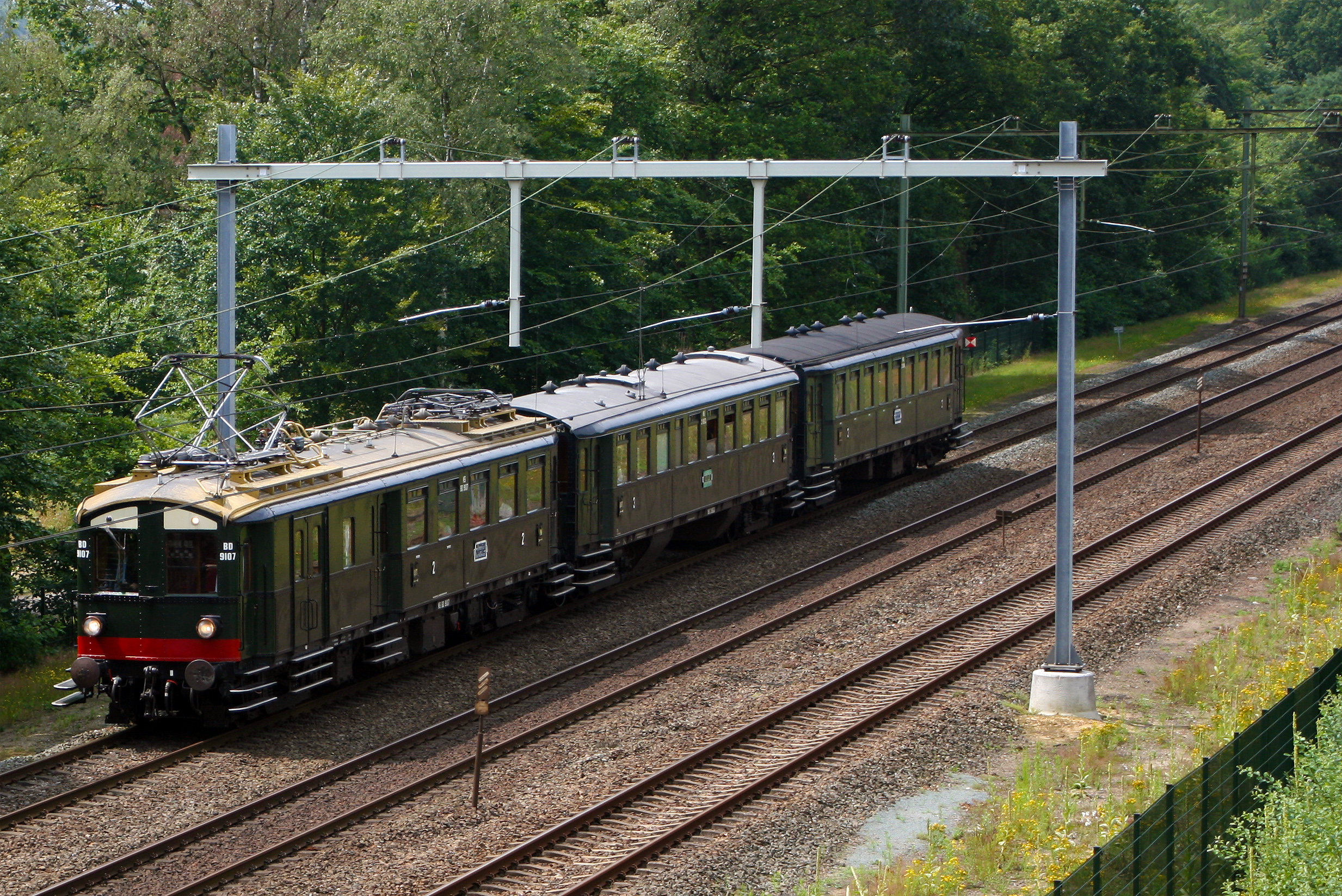
Museum Blokkendoos train set as 'Homesick Express' between Den Dolder and Soestduinen; 2014.

=== Preservation ===
In the eighties, an electric museum set was constructed from parts of various carriages, consisting of a motor carriage and a carriage with driver position. This set was completely restored and put into service in 1989. In 1994 an intermediate carriage, equipped with a restoration department, was added to increase the rentability for groups. This equipment is now in the collection of the NSM in Utrecht.

The two-car set initially consisted of the motor carriage mBD 9107 and the control car Ces 8104. The latter carriage never existed before: the series consisted of the Ces 8101 up to and including the Ces 8103, built by Beijnes in Haarlem. A "new" Ces 8104 was added to this series at the end of the 20th century in the main workshop in Amersfoort from various remnants of old blokkendozen carriage for the museum train set: the Ces 8104.

The Cecr 8553 intermediate carriage added later has been given the previously never used designation 'r', for restoration.

One of the motor carriages (the Jaap) was also restored in the 1990s by the main workshop Haarlem as a heritage carriage. This mC 9002 carriage has been restored to the original cream-green color scheme from the 1920s and can form a four-car unit together with the museum set of the Railway Museum.

Jules, originally mBD 9006 motor carriage, the other motor carriage that first bore the name Bromvlieg in 1968 and was renamed Jules in 1969, was converted into an ATB measurement carriage in 1976 and painted in the yellow livery. This carriage was taken out of service in 1992, after which it was acquired by the STIBANS in 1997 and painted in the brown livery as motor mail carriage mP 9204. This carriage is not roadworthy.

The Blokkendoos carriages used by the Stoomtrein Goes-Borsele (SGB) and the Veluwsche Stoomtrein Maatschappij (VSM) are pulled by a steam locomotive. There is also a motor carriage and two drawn carriages without museum status at a campsite in Eext.

On 3 November 2006, a Museum Blokkendoos train consisting of six carriages was driven on the mainline for the first time since the last one was withdrawn. This train consisted of the mC 9002, the three carriages of the Railway Museum and two intermediate carriages of the SGB. This made a trip of more than 1000 km through the country, to raise money for a good cause.

On 7 December 2013, four journeys were made with Blokkendoos carriages on the Zwolle – Lelystad route on the occasion of the first anniversary of the Hanzelijn. 150 inhabitants of surrounding cities received a special train ticket from the Dutch Railways.

== Preservation overview ==
Number	At	Note	Photo
Bd 7507	SGB	Formerly Bec 8509	
Ces 8104	NSM	Control carriage belonging to mBD 9107. Built from mCd 9411.	
Bec 8501	VSM	Initially at SSTT. In 1984 bought by the VSM.	
Cec 8503	VSM		
Cec 8505	VSM		
Cec 8512	Camping De Schaopvolte in Eext		
Aec 8508	VSM	Former carriage NS Ae4c3 8508, converted into an assembly carriage by the NS in 1957 with number 165 080 and later UIC 80 84 974 1618. Initially at SGB. bought by the VSM on 12 January 2015.	
Aec 8514	Camping De Schaopvolte in Eext		
Cec 8524	SGB	Formerly carriage B 133	
Bec 8527	VSM	Present as WR 8527	
Cec 8533	SGB	Formerly carriage B 134	
Cec 8535	VSM		
Cec 8536	VSM		
Cec 8543	SGB	Formerly Hoogovens Excursion Train 76102; before that B 8151 / 5704.	
Cec 8553	NSM	Forms a train set together with Ces 8104 and mBD 9107. Carriage Cec 8553 is used as the middle carriage of the Museum Blokkendoos Train.	
mC 9002	Working group Jaap; Haarlem main workshop	Renumbered in 1950 as mC 9452. Former motor service carriage 169306, which was used from 1967 for learning journeys from the Eindhoven depot as 30 84 978 2 500-7, together with the mC 9012 (later mC 9462, mB 9462, mDW 169310, 30 84 978 2 501–3).	
mBD 9006	wagonworkshop Amersfoort	Renumbered to BD 9106 in the 1930s, CD 9106 in 1945. Again BD 9106 in 1956. Rebuilt in 1957 to mP 9204. Renumbered to 978 2 812 in 1968, 978 1 802 a year later. Renumbered to 978 1 601 in 1976.	
mC 9014	STAR	Present as C 147. Sold in 2017 to M.IJ.S.M., Marrum-Westernijkerk station.	
mC 9015	SGB	Present as B 137	
mC 9037	Camping De Schaopvolte in Eext		
mBD 9021	wagonworkshop Amersfoort	Formerly Stibans	
mBD 9107	NSM	Has the front of BD 9016 ("Jim"); forms a train set together with Ces 8104 (and Cec 8553).	
mCd 9410	NSM	Previously in the Hoogovens Excursion Train as 76105. In use as a restaurant at the National Narrow Gauge Railway Museum.	
mCd 9415	Railway zone Tilburg	Bought from the SGB in 2016 (carriage C 139; used as a restaurant).	
mCd 9443	Railway zone Tilburg	Bought from the SGB in 2014 (carriage RB 136; used as a hotel).	

== Sources and references ==
- Van Wijck Jurriaanse, N.J.: Van stoom tot stroom. De Alk, Alkmaar, 1980. ISBN 90-6013-906-2
- Carel van Gestel, Bert van Reems, Lex Tempelman: Elektrische treinen in Nederland, deel 1. De Alk, Alkmaar, 1992. ISBN 90-6013-989-5
- Stalen rijtuigen van de Nederlandse Spoorwegen – Martijn Haman
- Nicospilt.com – Foto's van Mat '24 – Nico Spilt
- Mat'24 – Materieel 1924 (Blokkendoos) – Railwiki
