= Bickershaw Colliery =

Former coal mine in Lancashire, England

Coordinates: 53°29′34.7″N 2°33′20.35″W

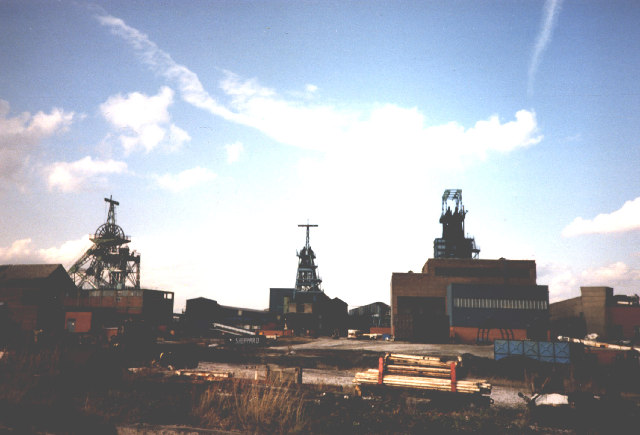
Bickershaw Colliery, shortly before closure, August 1990

Bickershaw Colliery was a coal mine, located on Plank Lane in Leigh, then within the historic county boundaries of Lancashire, England.

== History ==
Bickershaw is located in the Lancashire Coalfield, and required the sinking of deep shafts to access the coal. However, access to transport via the Leeds and Liverpool Canal at Plank Lane made the distribution of the product relatively easy.

The first shaft at Bickershaw was sunk in 1830 by Turner and Ackers. A tramway connected the pit to the canal which was used for transporting coal until August 1972 when road transport took over local distribution. In 1872 work started on two new shafts; No. 1 (489 yards (447 m)) and No. 2 (492 yards (450 m)) at Plank Lane beside the canal. The seams worked from these shafts were the Crombouke, Pemberton Five Feet and the White and Black mines. In 1877 shafts No. 3 and No. 4 (both 690 yards (630 m) in depth), were sunk to the King Coal mine. No. 5 pit was completed before World War I.

Bickershaw Collieries and Abram Collieries amalgamated in 1933 and never were owned by Moss Hall or by the Pearson and Knowles Coal Company. Mining operations at the former Abram Pits ceased in the late 1930s, except for Abram Nos.1&2 pits which were taken over by one Albert Longworth, consequently becoming known as the 'Albert Pit.' This was a drift mine, adjacent to Bolton House Road, continuing in operation until 1965. In 1975 Opencast mining began extracting from the area previously worked by Abram 1 & 2 pits, and a dispatching plant and sidings were erected on the site, worked by the NCB Opencast Executive's Sentinel 0-6-0 diesel shunter, continuing in operation until 1985. During the 1984/5 miners strike loaded MGR wagons were stored in the sidings, and also at nearby Abram North Sidings as the NUR and ASLEF would not allow their members to cross picket lines.

On 10 October 1932, a mine-shaft elevator carrying 20 people fell at the mine, killing all but one person.

In 1933, Abram Colliery closed and its shafts to the Arley mine were taken over by Bickershaw. This consolidation resulted in a modernisation scheme to open up the Peacock and Plodder mines, and an additional area of Wigan seam. Nos. 3 and 4 shafts were deepened to 779 yards (712 m) and 787 yards (720 m) respectively, taking the shaft bottoms just below the Plodder seam. By 1937 an electric winder was installed on both shafts, with cages to accept ten-ton capacity skips in No.4.

=== National Coal Board ===
Created by Clement Attlee's post-war Labour government to run nationalised industries, the Coal Industry Nationalisation Act 1946 received royal assent on 12 July, and the National Coal Board was formally constituted on 15 July, with Lord Hyndley as chairman. The number of companies taken over by the board was about two hundred, at a cost of £338 million.

Nationalisation brought about a review of pre-war development plans, which resulted in re-organisation of the pits in the area. After abandoning No.5 shaft in 1950, in 1951 two horizontal 16 feet (4.9 m) wide by 13 feet (4.0 m) high tunnels were driven 2,750 yards (2,510 m) in a southerly direction from No's 3 and 4 shafts. In 1960 these tunnels intersected the Crombouke seam, allowing and two more faces to be opened for production. An endless rope haulage was installed and 2,576 pounds (1.150 long tons; 1.288 short tons) capacity tubs were introduced to take coal to the skip pockets in No.4 shaft bottom.

After the success of this scheme, two similar tunnels were driven 1,500 yards (1,400 m) west from the same point of origin, gaining access to the White and Black seam in the south western field. The increased coal capacity resulted in the rope haulage system being replaced by a trunk conveying system in the main horizon tunnel, which had been extended to No.4 pit bottom. A 200-ton capacity surge bunker was installed to avoid delays in the event of stoppage at the shaft. A minor re-organisation and efficiency scheme was completed in 1967 which concentrated all production and coal winding in the Nos. 3 and 4 shafts, leaving Nos. 1 and 2 shafts for ventilation purposes.

=== Bickershaw super pit ===
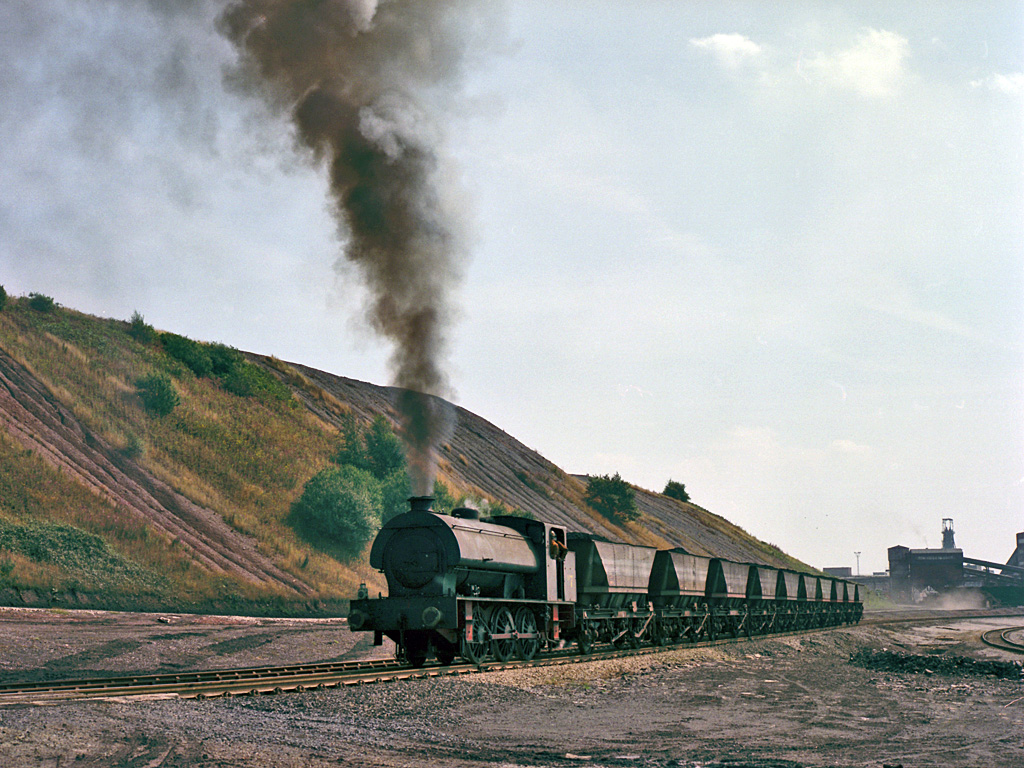
A National Coal Board Hunslet Austerity 0-6-0ST No 63.000.326 (works number 3776 of 1952) hauls ten loaded "Merry-go-round" coal hopper wagons from Bickershaw Colliery to the exchange sidings, 1983

In 1973, NCB super-pit development was started. Completed in 1976 at a cost of £3 million, it linked Bickershaw underground with the neighbouring Parsonage and Golborne collieries. The project required the installation of 7 miles (11 km) of conveyor belt underground to consolidate coal extraction to the surface at Bickershaw. A surface based electronic control system managed the flow from three pits faces, and monitored underground conditions. Parsonage continued to be used for winding men and materials but from 1 January 1983, the pit became fully integrated with Bickershaw for administration and management. One coal face was in operation in the Peacock mine and one in the Trencherbone, both fully mechanised and equipped with powered supports. The total combined underground colliery workforce at this point was 550 men.

Additional investment on the surface at Bickershaw resulted in the capability to process one million tons of coal annually. With 90% of combined total production for electricity generation, a £90,000 surface rapid loading system at the Bickershaw coal preparation plant enabled a train of 45 wagons, each capable of holding 30 tons of coal, to be loaded with 1,350 tons of coal in less than one and a half hours. These wagons were dispatched to Bickershaw exchange sidings, and onwards to the Central Electricity Generating Board. The residual 10% of production was general, industrial and domestic coal, dispatched via road and the use of canal barges ended.

After the colliery celebrated its centenary in June 1977, with a week of activities and a special open day for visitors, a final development was undertaken. Filling in No.2 shaft, allowed the opening up retreat faces in the Haigh/Yard Plodder seams, where the coal was over 3 metres (9.8 ft) thick.

=== Closure ===
After the closure of Golborne Colliery in 1989, the pits production target was set at an increased 20,000 tonnes a week. However, with targets consistently missed, the 600 miners were balloted on a move to give Bickershaw a stay of execution, against British Coal submitting a report showing the colliery to be unprofitable. Resultantly, both Bickershaw and Parsonage Collieries finally closed on 13 March 1992

== Colliery Band ==
After Abram Colliery closed its brass band was taken over by Bickershaw. The band was conducted by Harry Mortimer and won various regional and national trophies.

== Transport ==
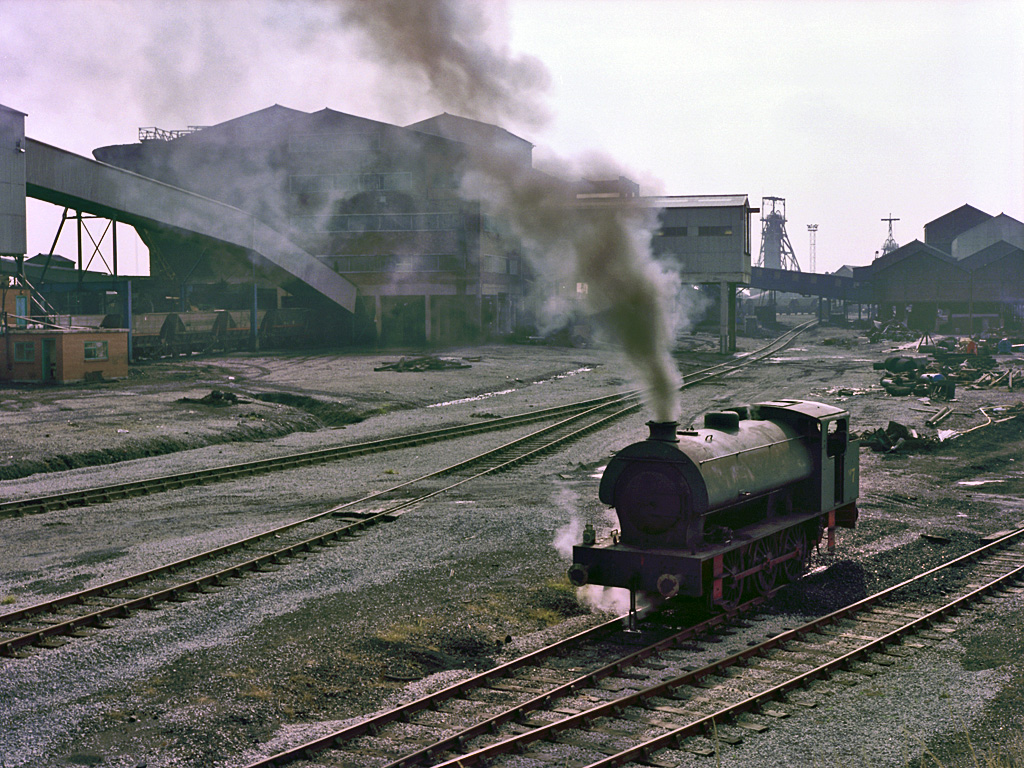
An NCB Hunslet Austerity 0-6-0ST awaits its next duties at Bickershaw Colliery, 1983

Built in its location for access to the Leeds and Liverpool Canal, from 1874 the development of the Wigan Junction Railways with access to Glazebrook and hence onwards via either the Cheshire Lines Committee or later the Great Central Railway, lead to an increase in use of railway traffic. Extensive sidings were developed both onsite and at Kenyon Junction, enabling services to be dispatched to the increasingly important electricity generating station traffic.

All onsite shunting and movement between pit head and the coal washing plant was undertaken by privately owned shunters, the traffic for which greatly increased after the consolidation of coal extraction of the three pits to Bickershaw. Once washed, loaded coal wagons were the marshalled onwards to the exchange sidings with British Railways at Bickershaw and Abram. Latterly part of the Merry-go-round train system, the trains were most often hauled by a pair of British Rail Class 20 diesel locomotives, en route to Fiddlers Ferry Power Station.

== Accidents ==
Men from Bickershaw attended the Abram Colliery disaster in 1881, in which 81 men died.

- September 1847: a collier and his drawer were descending the Bolton House pit when they were engulfed in flames. One killed, one injured.
- 10 October 1932: a mine-shaft elevator fell. Nineteen killed, one injured.
- 18 October 1940: death of Alfred Robert Wilkinson, a Victoria Cross recipient, from carbon monoxide poisoning
- 10 October 1959: explosion behind stoppings in the Plodder Seam. Five killed, one injured.

== Present day ==
Managed by English Partnerships, the derelict site became part of a £386.5 million National Coalfields Programme in 1996. In 2005, a discussion was opened with the community on redeveloping the site as a mixed development to create new jobs, homes, leisure facilities and open space. Now named Bickershaw South and owned by the Northwest Regional Development Agency, the site was included as part of the UK Governments Carbon Challenge initiative in 2007 to accelerate the building industry's response to a 2016 target for all new housing to be zero carbon. As a result, a 2MW wind turbine is being built on the adjacent Wigan Council-owned, Bickershaw North site, to provide energy for the development. In October 2009, a £12million contract was let to Birse Civils to prepare the site for redevelopment, with outline planning permission for the development of up to 650 homes and 2,750 square metres (29,600 ft^{2}) of employment space on the 23 hectares (57 acres) site, within a total area redevelopment plan covering some 237 hectares (590 acres).

== See also ==
- List of mining disasters in Lancashire
- Glossary of coal mining terminology
