= Stoomtrein Goes - Borsele =

Heritage railway line in the Netherlands

Coordinates: 51°29′52″N 3°52′51″E

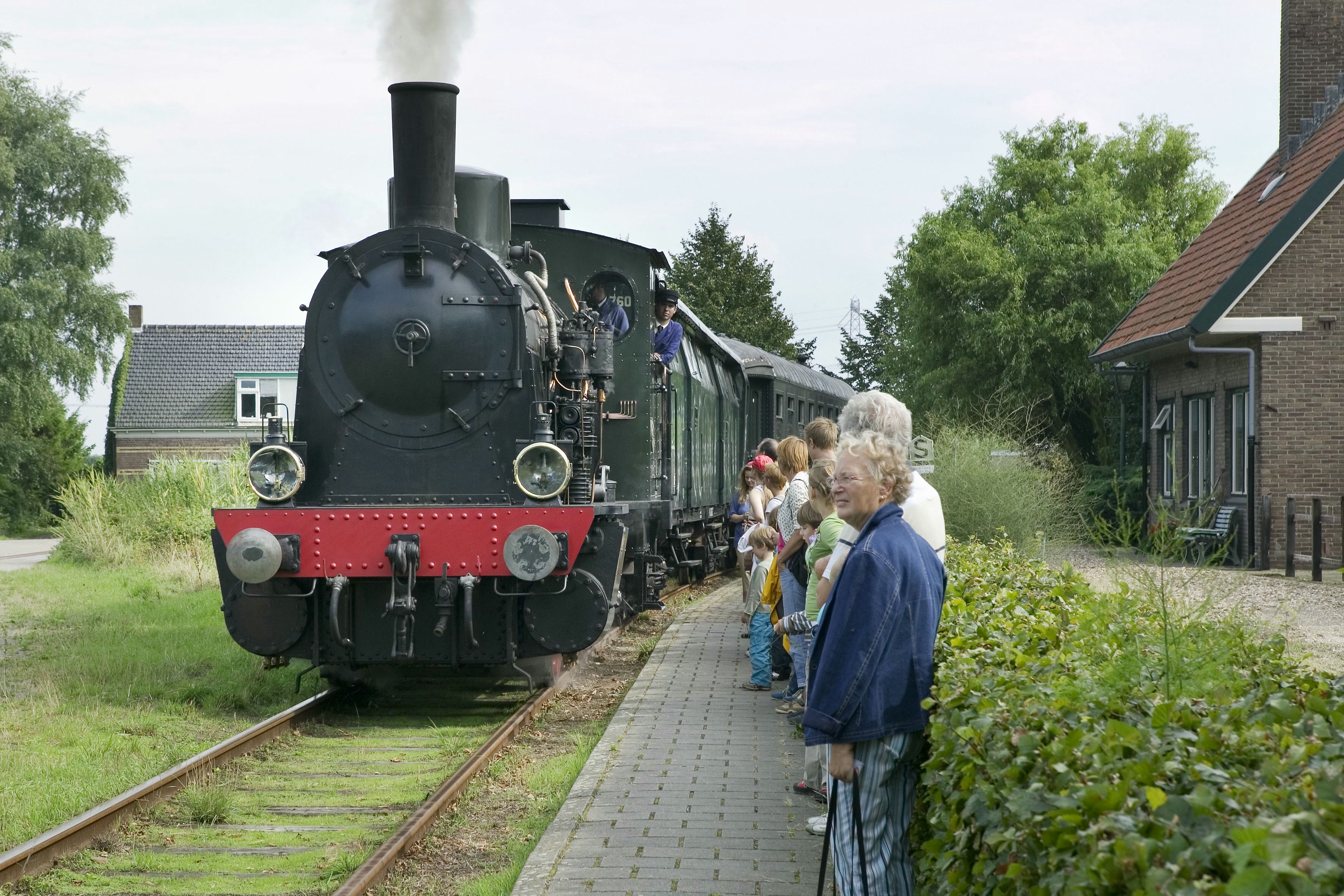
Steam locomotive at the Kwadendamme station

The Stoomtrein Goes - Borsele (Goes-Borsele Steam Train) is a heritage railway operating from Goes through Kwadendamme to the village of Hoedekenskerke, in the province of Zeeland, Netherlands.

== Route ==
The railway's headquarters are located at Goes. From here trains operate to 's-Gravenpolder, Nisse, Kwadendamme, Hoedekenskerke, and finally Baarland. When operating the service using vintage diesel railcars, trains call at all six stations. However, on steam operating days, trains call only at the stations in Goes, Kwadendamme, and Hoedekenskerke. On intensive service days the railway operates both steam trains and diesel railcar trains, but with the same rules about stations.

== Locomotives ==
The railway operates a fleet of seventeen locomotives - nine diesel engines, six steam engines, and two relatively unusual 1,500 volt Alstom electric engines. Additionally, three heritage diesel railcars are in service.
