= FBF =

FBF may refer to:

== Sport ==
- Benin Football Federation (French: Fédération Béninoise de Football)
- Bolivian Football Federation (Spanish: Federación Boliviana de Fútbol)
- Burkinabé Football Federation (French: Fédération Burkinabé de Football)
- Federação Bahiana de Futebol, the Football Federation of Bahia, Brazil

== Other uses ==
- Federal Bridge Formula, a U.S. formula for calculating maximum allowable vehicle weights for bridges
- Fédération Bancaire Française, the French Banking Federation
- Fine Air, an American cargo airline
- Flange-bearing frog
- Floyd Bennett Field, a former airfield near New York City
- Forbrugsforeningen, a Danish trade loyalty society
- Frankfurt Book Fair, a German trade fair
- Fredrika Bremer Association (Swedish: Fredrika-Bremer-Förbundet), a Swedish women's rights organization
- Free the Bears Fund, an Australian wildlife charity
