= Junction (rail) =

Train track interchange

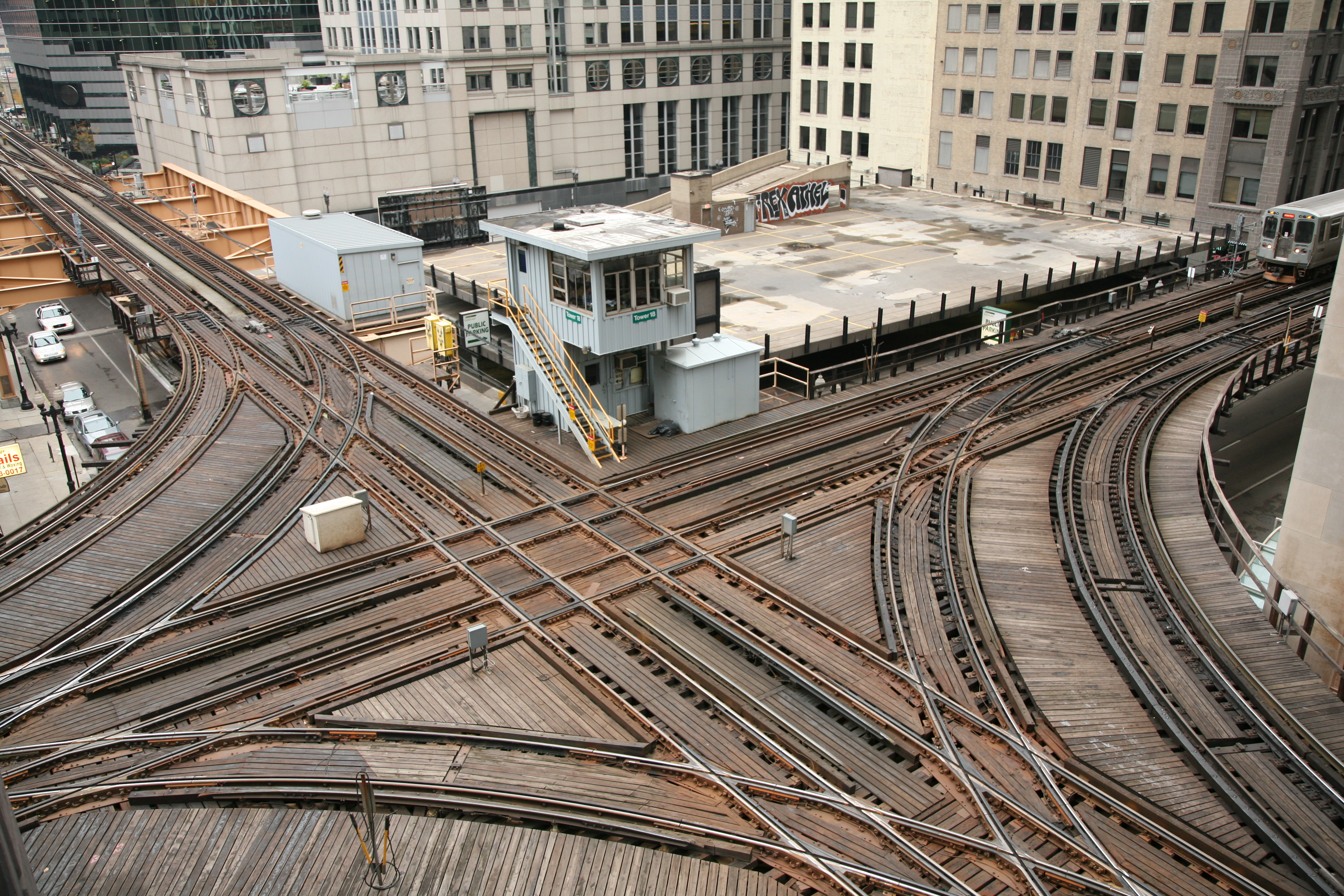
Chicago Transit Authority signal tower 18 guides elevated Chicago 'L' north and southbound Purple and Brown lines intersecting with east and westbound Pink and Green lines and the looping Orange line above the Wells and Lake street intersection in the loop. This is a three-quarters grand union junction.

A junction, in the context of rail transport, is a place at which two or more rail routes converge or diverge. The physical connection between the tracks of the two routes (assuming they are of the same gauge) is provided by turnouts (US: switches) and signalling.

== Overview ==
In a simple case where two routes with one or two tracks each meet at a junction, a fairly simple layout of tracks suffices to allow trains to transfer from one route to the other. More complicated junctions are needed to permit trains to travel in either direction after joining the new route – for example by providing a triangular track layout. (Note: In this latter case, the three points of the triangle may be given different names, for example using points of the compass as well as the name of the overall place.)

Rail transport operations refer to stations that lie on or near a railway junction as a junction station. In the UK it is customary for the junction (and the related station) to be named after the next station on the branch, e.g. Yeovil Junction is on the mainline railway south of Yeovil, and the next destination on the branch is Yeovil Pen Mill. Frequently, trains are built up and taken apart (separated) at such stations so that the same train can be divided and proceed to multiple destinations. For goods trains (US: freight trains), marshalling yards (US: Classification yards) serve a similar purpose.

== Measures to improve junction capacity ==
The capacity of the junctions limits the capacity of a railway network more than the capacity of individual railway lines. This applies more as the network density increases. Measures to improve junctions are often more useful than building new railway lines. The capacity of a railway junction can be increased with improved signaling measures, by building points suitable for higher speeds, or by turning level junctions into flying junctions, where tracks are grade-separated, and so one track passes over or under another. With more complicated junctions such construction can rapidly become very expensive, especially if space is restricted by tunnels, bridges or inner-city tracks.

== Avoiding the need for junctions ==
The installation of junctions into a rail system poses many challenges, including increased maintenance costs, and problems in on-time performance. Metro rail systems have a rail network design where the number of junctions is minimized. Passengers, and not trains, move from one train station to another.

== Gallery ==
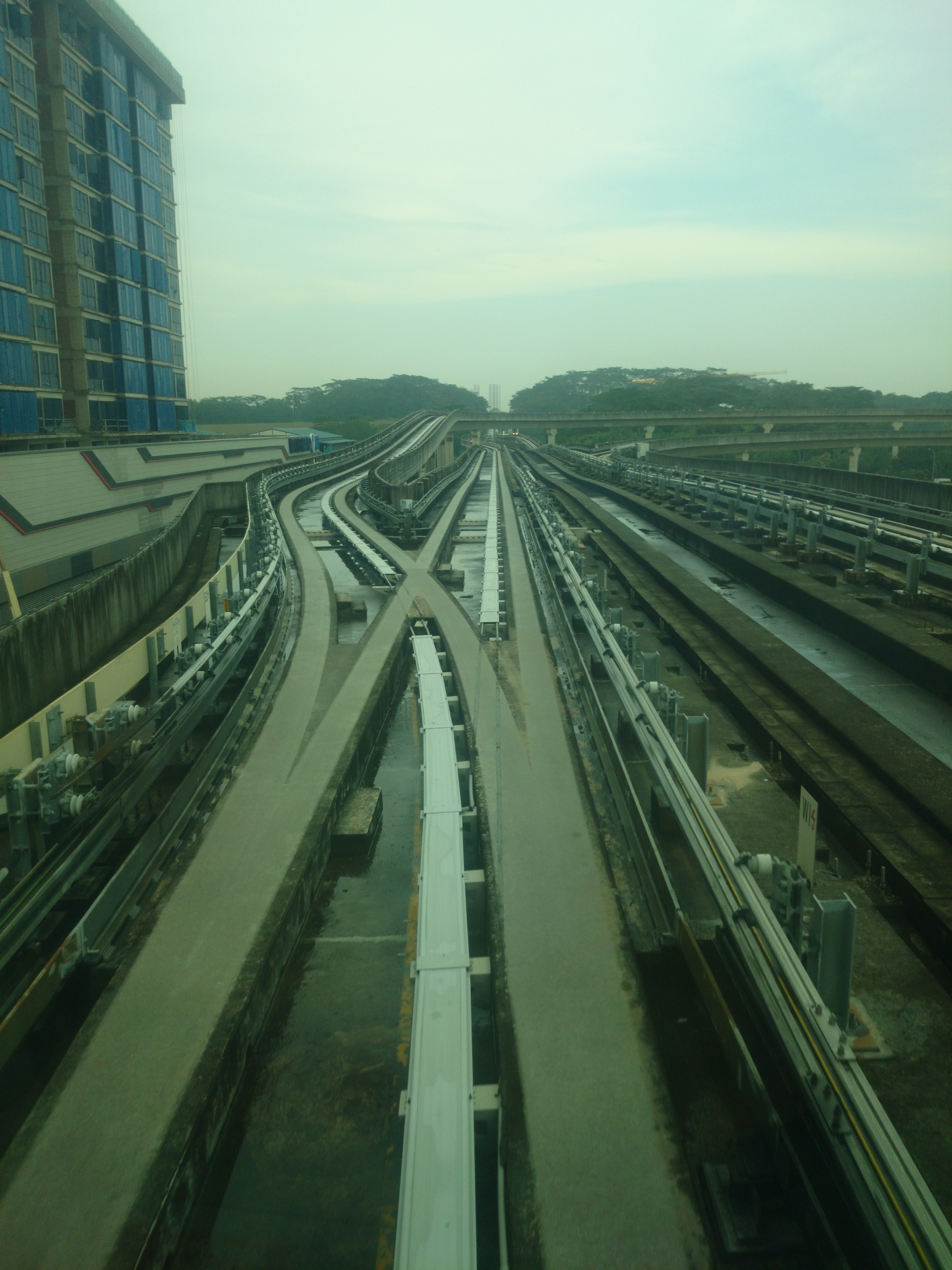
Junction in track of Singapore LRT

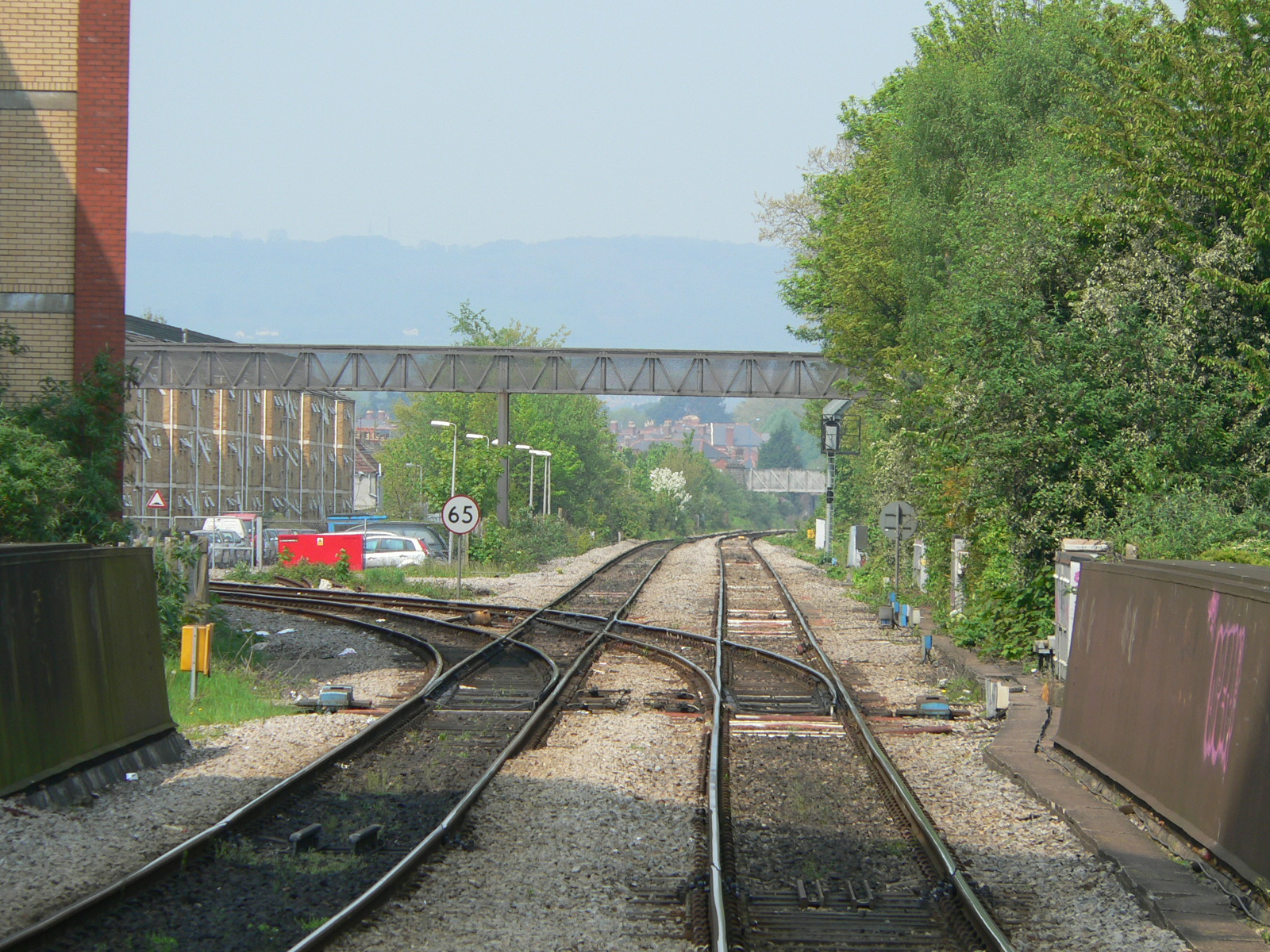
A double junction in Cardiff, Wales

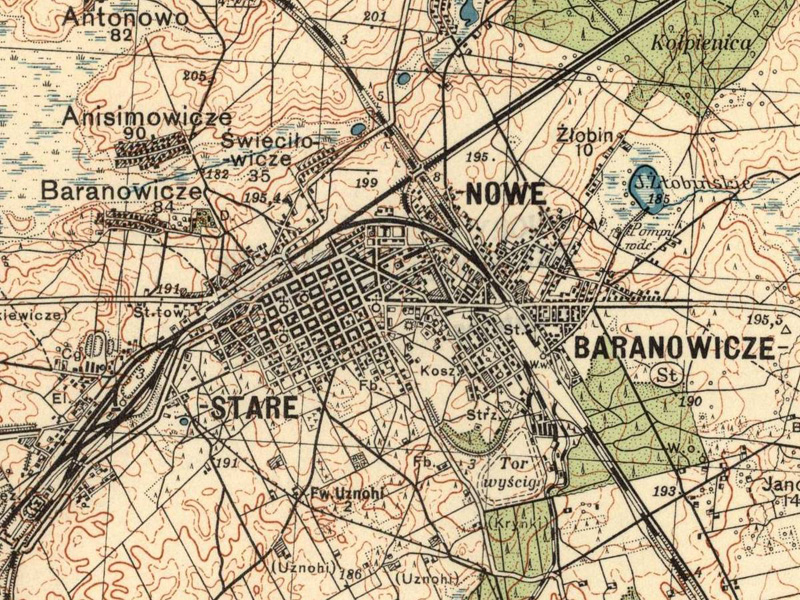
A junction in Baranowicze, Poland, 1934 (since 1939 in Belarus)

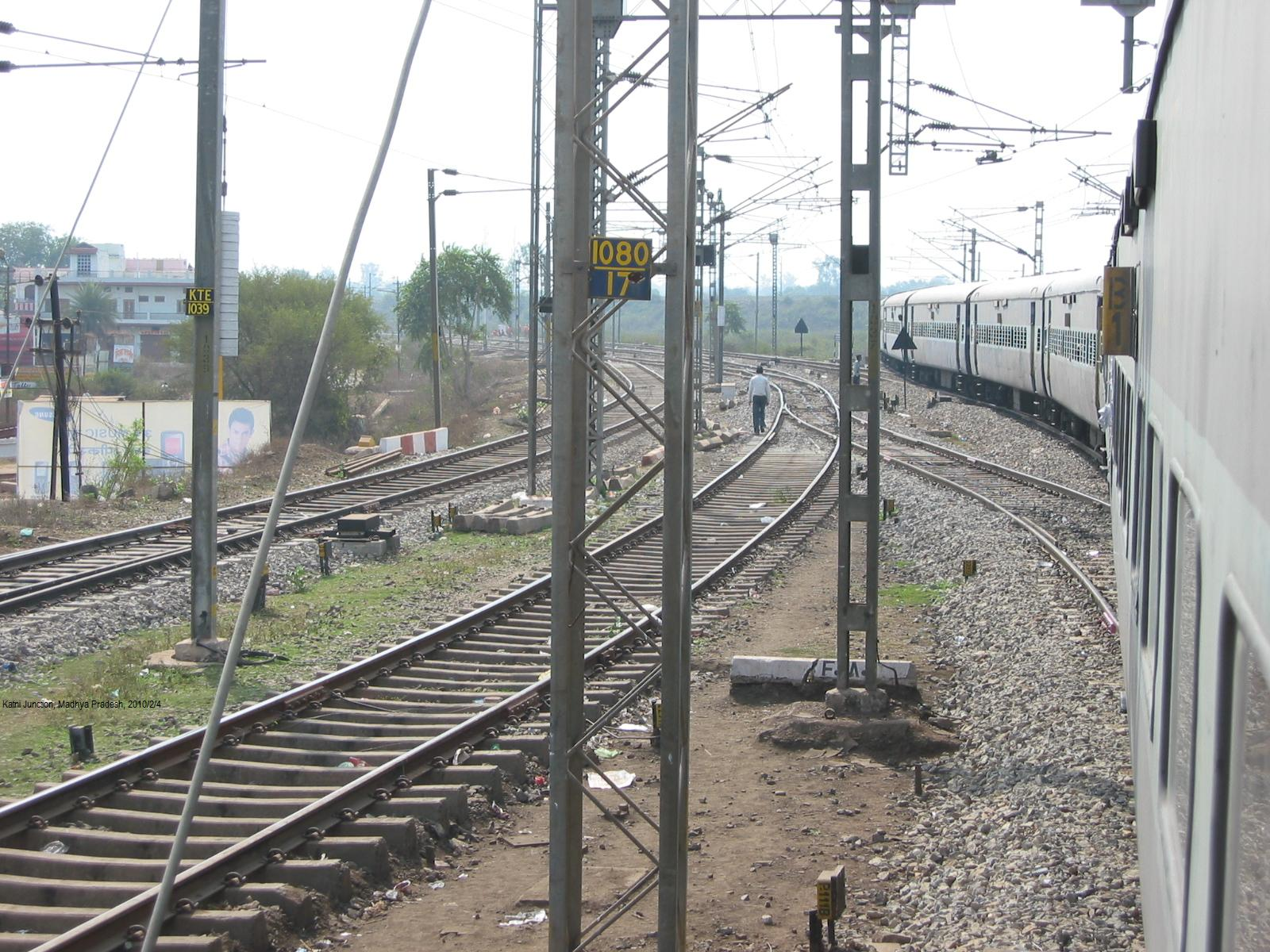
A train passing through Katni Junction in Madhya Pradesh, India

== See also ==
- Diamond crossing
- Double junction
- Interlocking
- Junction (traffic)
- Level junction
- Railroad switch
