= Grade separation =

Type of road junction

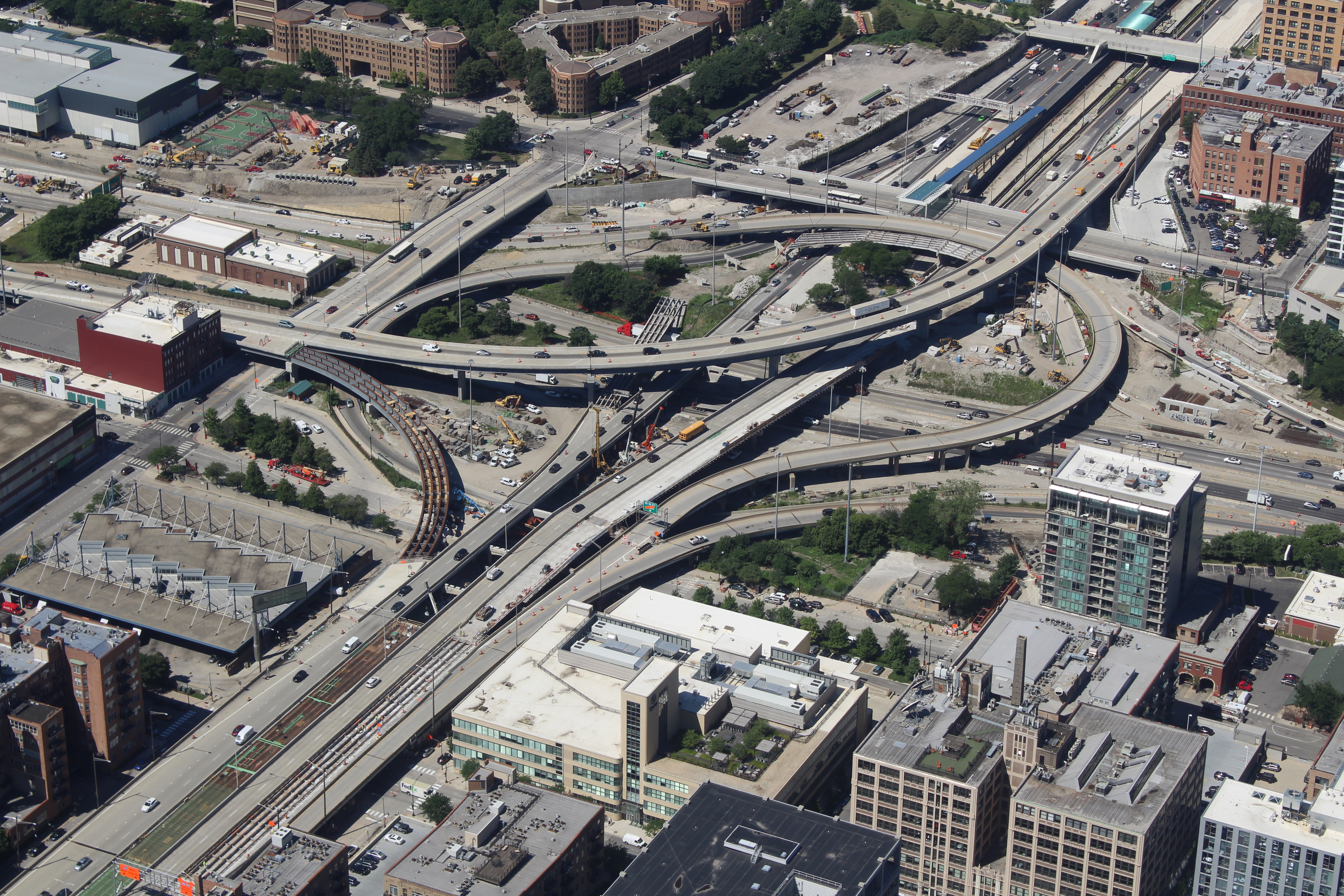
An example of the potential complexity of grade separation, seen in the Jane Byrne Interchange in Chicago

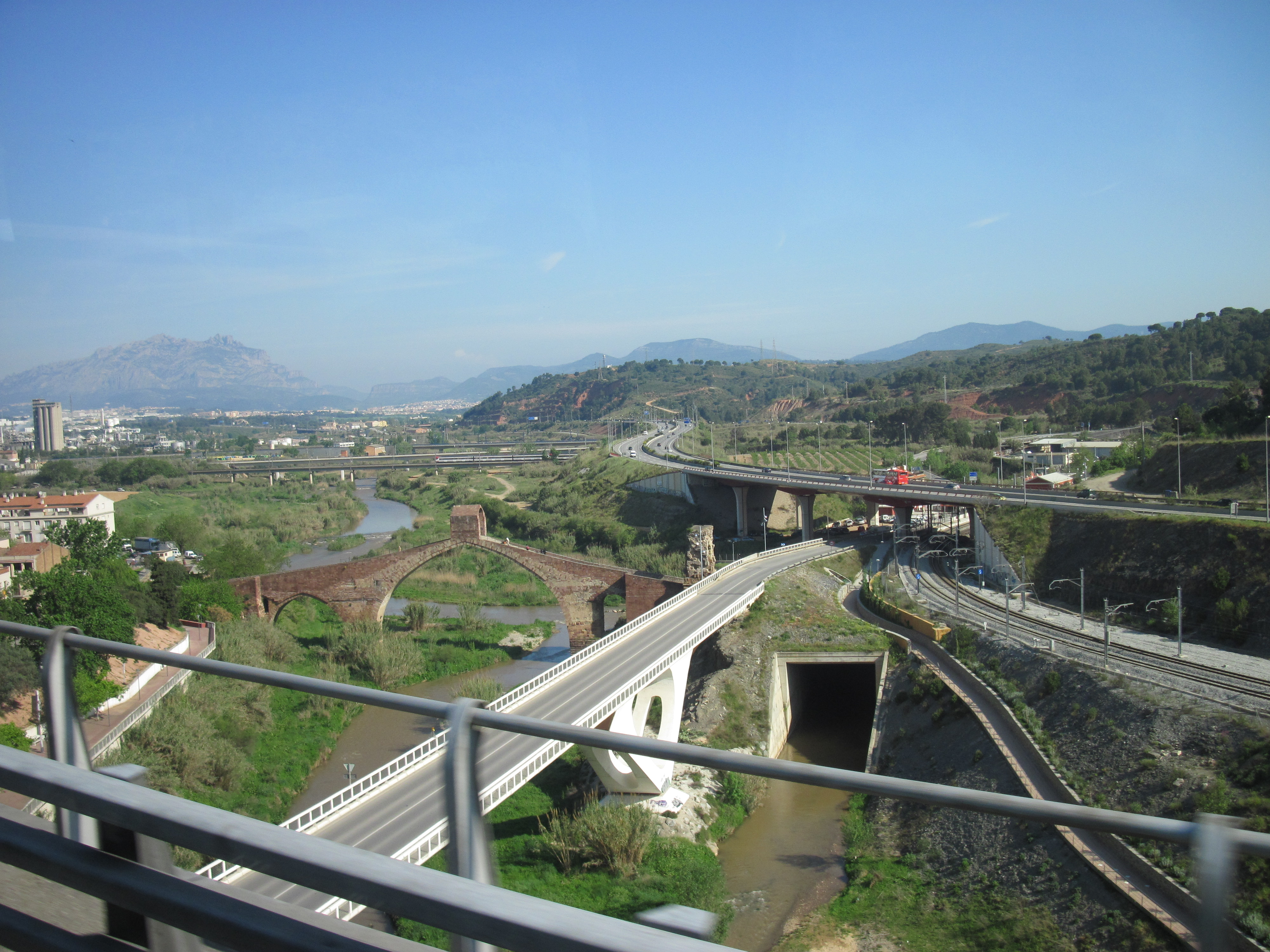
Seven various overpasses for grade separation in Spain near Barcelona

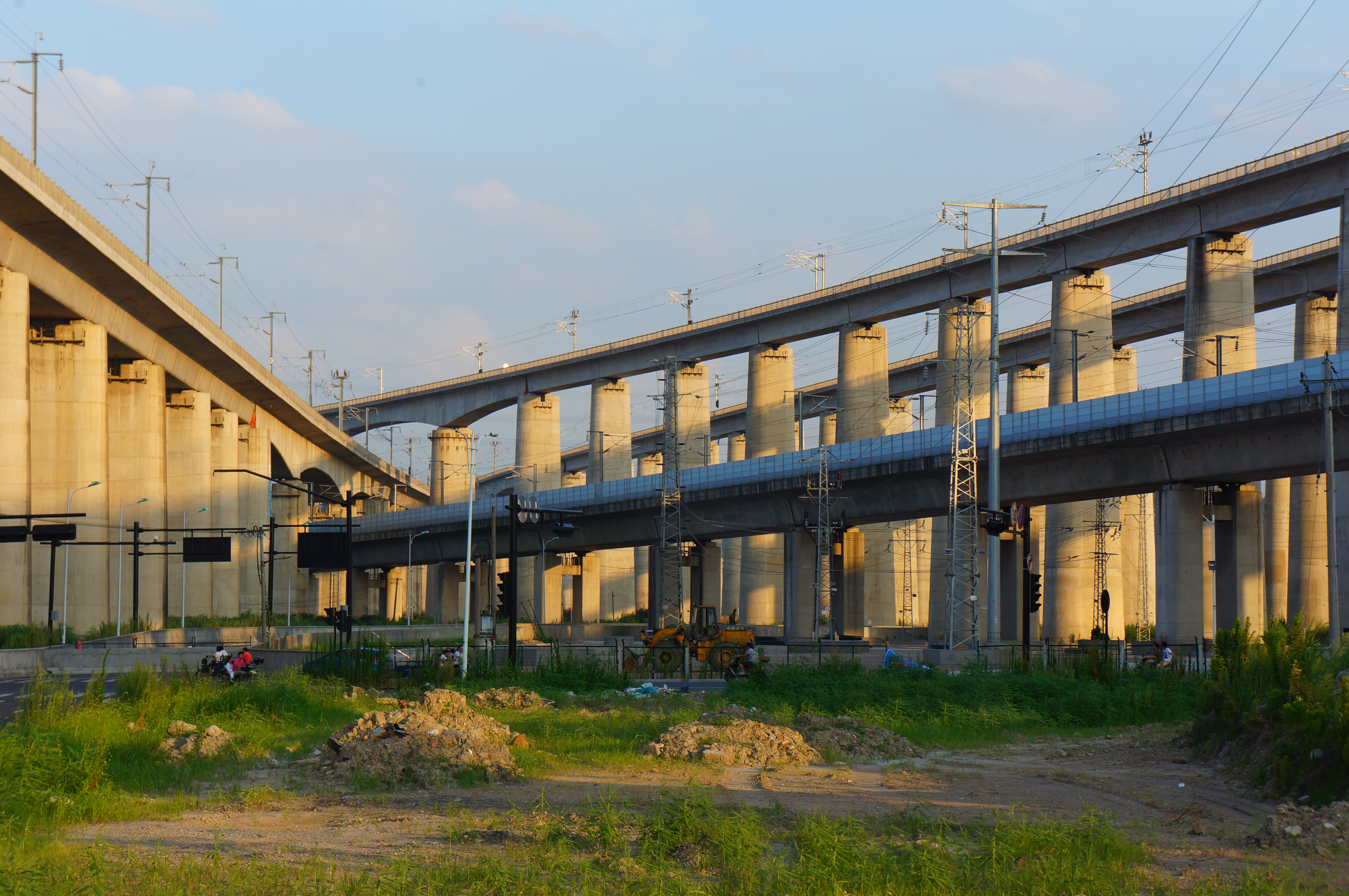
Rail-rail grade separation in Xiaoshan, China

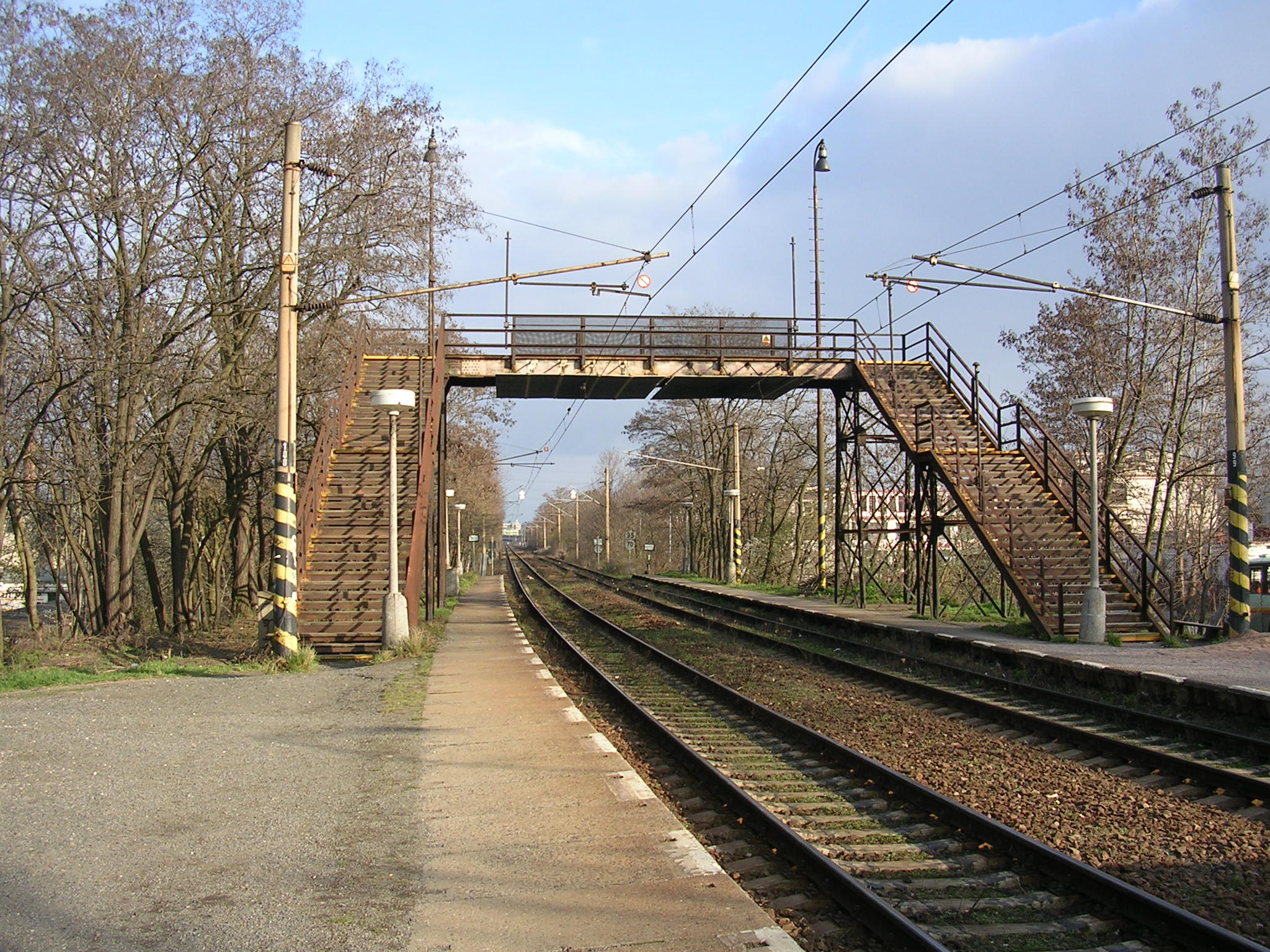
The concept of grade separation includes all transport modes, such as a simple pedestrian bridge over rail tracks.

In civil engineering (and more specifically, highway or railway engineering), grade separation is a method of aligning a junction of two or more surface transport axes at different heights (grades) so that they will not disrupt the traffic flow on other transit routes when they cross each other. The composition of such transport axes does not have to be uniform; it can consist of a mixture of roads, footpaths, railways, canals, or airport runways. Bridges (or overpasses, also called flyovers), tunnels (or underpasses), or a combination of both can be built at a junction to achieve the needed grade separation.

In North America, a grade-separated junction may be referred to as a grade separation or as an interchange—in contrast with an intersection, at-grade, a diamond crossing or a level crossing, which are not grade-separated.

== Effects ==
=== Advantages ===
Roads with grade separation generally allow traffic to move freely, with fewer interruptions, and at higher overall speeds; this is why speed limits are typically higher for grade-separated roads and grade separation is typically a prerequisite for the implementation of meaningfully high-speed rail.

In addition, reducing the complexity of traffic movements can reduce the risk of accidents and further, reduce or preclude entirely the threat of vehicular homicide and fatal cyclist-vehicle collisions that becomes statistically inevitable with a large enough population of pedestrians or cyclists crossing even a modestly trafficked thoroughfare with reasonable posted speed limits. In the literal sense, only grade separation and the restriction of vehicle access to pedestrian spaces can actually and effectively reduce the probability of these deaths occurring regularly in any particular area to zero.

While much less common and generally easier to prevent than automotive and truck collisions with cyclists and pedestrians, vehicle-train, cyclist-train and pedestrian-train collisions are almost exclusively fatal, particularly when involving heavy or freight rail, and avoidable only on the end of the collision's victim in the absence of grade separation in most cases. Regardless of the competency and alertness of a train driver, there is nothing that the operator of a locomotive traveling at-speed can do to stop a train completely before reaching the most distant point on the tracks ahead of the driver that they were able to see at the point they first knew to apply the brake.

This is considerably less true in relation to light rail and trams, which frequently operate in mixed traffic and as such are comparably lightweight and responsive to braking, able to come to a halt at roughly the same rates as would a bus or lorry (truck), and usually stop in less time than a loaded semi-truck.

While trains overall are relatively predictable and pass far less frequently than automotive traffic, these collisions still occur with some regularity, particularly at grade crossings. As such, grade-separated crossings for railroads are both less challenging and expensive to implement, and similarly result in improved safety for all parties, at least when the comparably low rate of train collisions compared to road deaths is not taken into account.

=== Disadvantages ===
With roadway junctions in particular, grade-separated interchanges are typically space-intensive, complicated, and costly, due to the need for large physical structures such as tunnels, ramps, and bridges. Their height can be obtrusive, and this, combined with the large traffic volumes that grade-separated roads attract, tend to make them unpopular to nearby landowners and residents. For these reasons, proposals for new grade-separated roads can receive significant public opposition.

Rail-over-rail grade separations, though, take up much less space than standard road or highway grade separations. In part, this is because shoulders are not required for railroad operations, even at high speeds, and there are generally far fewer branches and side road connections to accommodate because a partial grade separation will yield more improvement than it would for a similar road project, on which the overall traffic flow is determined by its most congested sections, as a result of well documented phenomena such as traffic waves.

However, highway, mixed and even railroad-only grade separation projects, especially when 'retrofitting' an active transit corridor built without traffic conflict mitigations to save on construction costs, nonetheless usually necessitates considerable engineering expertise and effort, and can be very expensive and time-consuming to construct, especially when multiple environmental and existing-traffic related impacts must be studied, determined and adequately mitigated, as is required by law for projects of this nature in most jurisdictions.

Grade-separated pedestrian and cycling routes often have a comparably modest footprint since they do not typically intersect with high intensity transit corridors (highways especially) that they would cross, without the safety provided by a grade-separated crossing. However, grade-separated pedestrian crossings with steps introduce accessibility problems and can potentially conflict with the Americans with Disabilities Act in the United States. Some crossings have lifts, but these measures can be time-consuming and inconvenient to use, and many of these footbridges and pedestrian underpasses lie unused, abandoned and fenced off.

Grade-separated roads that permit for higher speed limits can actually reduce safety due to 'weaving' (see below), the increased probability of collisions corresponding with induced demand as well as the demonstrably false sense of safety caused by the monotony of driving long distances at high speeds with little or none of the stimulation and activity provided at-grade by stop lights, pedestrian crossings, more frequent turns and intersections.

== Roads ==
=== Overview ===
The term is most widely applied to describe a road junction in which the direct flow of traffic on one or more of the roads is not disrupted. Instead of a direct connection, traffic must use on and off ramps (United States, Australia, New Zealand) or slip roads (United Kingdom, Ireland) to access the other roads at the junction. The road which carries on through the junction can also be referred to as grade separated.

Typically, large freeways, highways, motorways, or dual carriageways are chosen to be grade separated, through their entire length or for part of it. Grade separation drastically increases the capacity of a road compared to an identical road with at-grade junctions. For instance, it is extremely uncommon to find an at-grade junction on a British motorway; it is all but impossible on a U.S. Interstate Highway, though a few do exist.

If traffic can traverse the junction from any direction without being forced to come to a halt, then the junction is described as fully grade separated or free-flowing.

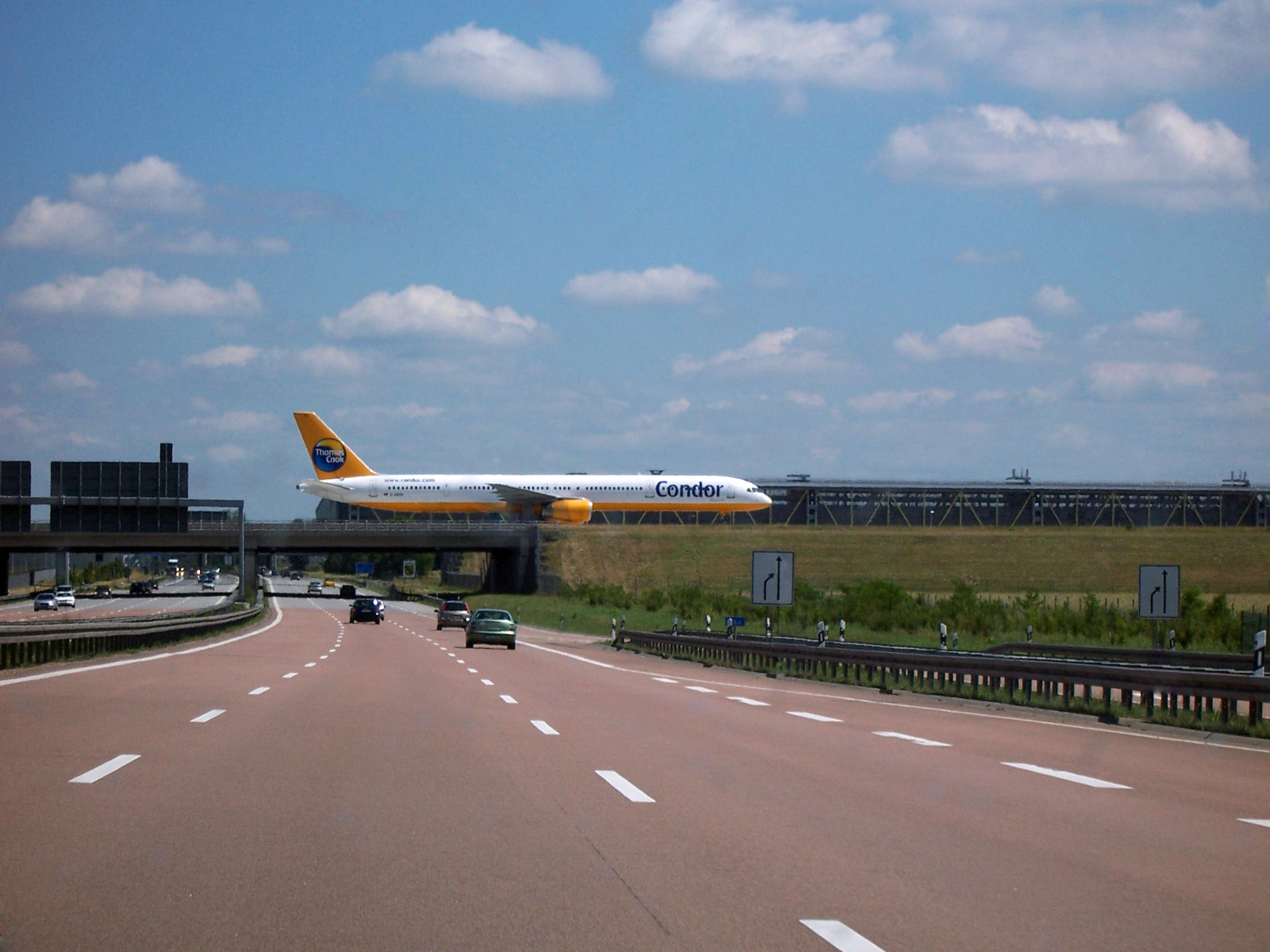
A plane on a taxiway over the Autobahn at Leipzig-Halle Airport—a type of grade separation

=== Types ===
==== Fully separated ====
These junctions connect two freeways:

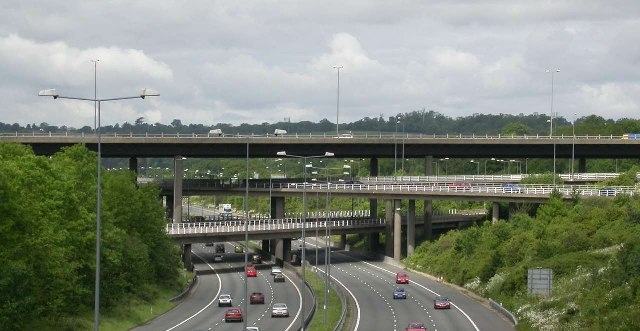
Four-level stack interchange between the M25 (below) and M23 (above) in the UK

- Stack interchange (two-level, three-level, or four-level stack, depending on how many levels cross at the central point)
- Cloverleaf interchange
- Trumpet interchange
- Cloverstack interchange
- Directional T
- Semi-directional T
- Turbine (whirlpool) interchange
- Windmill interchange
- Various incarnations of spaghetti junction

==== Partially separated ====
These junctions connect two roads, but only one is fully grade-separated, i.e. traffic on one road does not have to stop at yield lines or signals on one road, but may have to do so when switching to the other:

- Diamond interchange
- Partial cloverleaf interchange
- Single-point urban interchange
- Roundabout interchange
- Compact grade-separation, whereby the two roads are linked by a compact "connector road", with major-minor priority junctions at each of its ends; usually a variant of the cloverleaf type interchange, but only involving two quadrants rather than four

=== Weaving ===
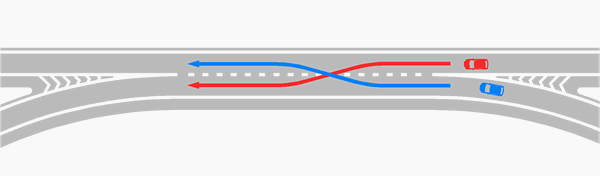
An example of weaving, where traffic drives on the left: the blue car entering the grade-separated road, and both the red and blue car exiting must change lanes in the short distance provided

On roadways with grade-separated interchanges, weaving is a result of placing an exit ramp a short distance after an entry ramp, causing conflicts between traffic attempting to leave the roadway at the next junction and traffic attempting to enter from the previous junction. This situation is most prevalent either where the junction designer has placed the on-slip to the road before the off-slip at a junction (for example, the cloverleaf interchange), or in urban areas with many close-spaced junctions. The ring road of Coventry, England, is a notorious example, as are parts of the southern M25, the London orbital motorway, the M6/M5 junction north-west of Birmingham, and the A4/M5 junction west of Bristol. Weaving can cause side-on collisions on very fast roads with top speeds of up to 200 km/h (120 mph), as well as the problem of blind spots.

Where junctions have unusual designs weaving can be a problem other than on the main road. An example of this can be found at Junction 7 of the M6, where traffic joining the roundabout from the M6 Eastbound off-slip must weave with the traffic already on the roundabout wishing to use the M6 Westbound on-slip. This is a result of the slip roads on the west side of the junction connecting to the roundabout on the inside of the eastern arc rather than the outside of the western arc as is normal. The two slip-roads are connected by a single lane on the inside of the roundabout, which traffic wishing to use the Westbound on-slip must join, and traffic from the Eastbound off-slip must leave.

Weaving can be alleviated by using collector/distributor roads or braided ramps to separate entering and exiting traffic.

==== Types ====
The weaving area can be categorized in to three categories based on number of lane changes required for each traffic flow:

- Type A configuration: any weaving traffic must change lane at least once.
- Type B configuration: one of the two weaving movements can be completed without a lane change; the other movement requires at most one lane change.
- Type C configuration: one weaving movement has a "through" lane (or multiple?) without lane change necessary; the other flow must make at least two lane changes.

==== Length ====
In the United States, the length of a weaving area is measured as 2 ft (0.61 m) away from the left edge of the ramp lane edge to a point at the diverge gore area where these two points are separated by 12 ft (3.7 m). Roess et al. speculates that this measuring practice dates back to a 1963 database assembled by Bureau of Public Roads, when the weaving ramps involved cloverleaf interchanges. In their early designs, the departure angle of the off-ramps is greater than the merge angle of on-ramps.

== Railways ==
=== With roads and footpaths ===
In railway construction, grade separation also means the avoidance of level crossings by making any roads or footpaths crossing the line either pass under or over the railway on bridges. This greatly improves safety and is crucial to the safe operation of high-speed lines. The construction of new level crossings is generally not permitted, especially for high speed railway lines and level crossings are increasingly less common due to the increase of both road and rail traffic. Efforts to remove level crossings are done in the UK by Network Rail and in Melbourne as part of the Level Crossing Removal Project.

The London Extension of the Great Central Railway, built between 1896 and 1899, was the first fully grade-separated railway of this type in the UK. This also applies to light rail and even to streetcars.

=== Flying junction ===
Attempts have been made to increase the capacity of railways by making tracks cross in a grade-separated manner, as opposed to the traditional use of flat crossings to change tracks. A grade-separated rail interchange is known as a flying junction and one which is not a level junction.

In 1897, the London and South Western Railway (LSWR) made use of a flying junction at Worting Junction south of Basingstoke to allow traffic on the Salisbury and Southampton routes to converge without conflicting movements; this became known as "Battledown Flyover". Also in Britain, the Southern Railway later made extensive use of flying junctions on other parts of its busy former LSWR main line.

Today in Britain, the tightly grouped nest of flying junctions to the north of Clapham Junction railway station—although technically a combination of many junctions—handle more than 4,000 trains per day (about one train every 15 seconds).

Virtually no major railway lines still cross (forming an 'X' shape) at flat level (although many diverge - i.e. 'Y' shape).

=== High-speed railways (200 km/h or 120 mph+) ===
On almost all high-speed railway lines, the faster speed requires grade separation. Therefore, many high-speed lines are elevated, especially in Taiwan and Japan, where population density alongside high-speed lines is higher than in France, Italy or Germany.

In the United States, a flying junction on the Nickel Plate Road through Cleveland, Ohio, was completed in 1913. The most frequent use was later found on the former Pennsylvania Railroad main lines. The lines are included as part of the Northeast Corridor and Keystone Corridor now owned by Amtrak. The most complex of these junctions, near Philadelphia Zoo, handles railway traffic for Amtrak, SEPTA, New Jersey Transit, Norfolk Southern, CSX Transportation, and Conrail.

In what is known as "area 1520", which includes the former Soviet Union and other regions using the same gauge, the most complicated grade-separation railpoint is found at Liubotyn in Ukraine.

== Footbridges and subways ==
Footbridges and subways (called underpasses in North America as well as in the United Kingdom when referring to roads) may be employed to allow pedestrians and cyclists to cross busy or fast streets. They are often used over and under motorways since at-grade pedestrian crossings are generally not permitted. The same can be said for railways. Though introduced to Central Park in New York City in the 1860s, subways are far more common today in Europe, especially in countries such as the Netherlands and Denmark where cycling is strongly encouraged. Long underpasses may be called tunnels.

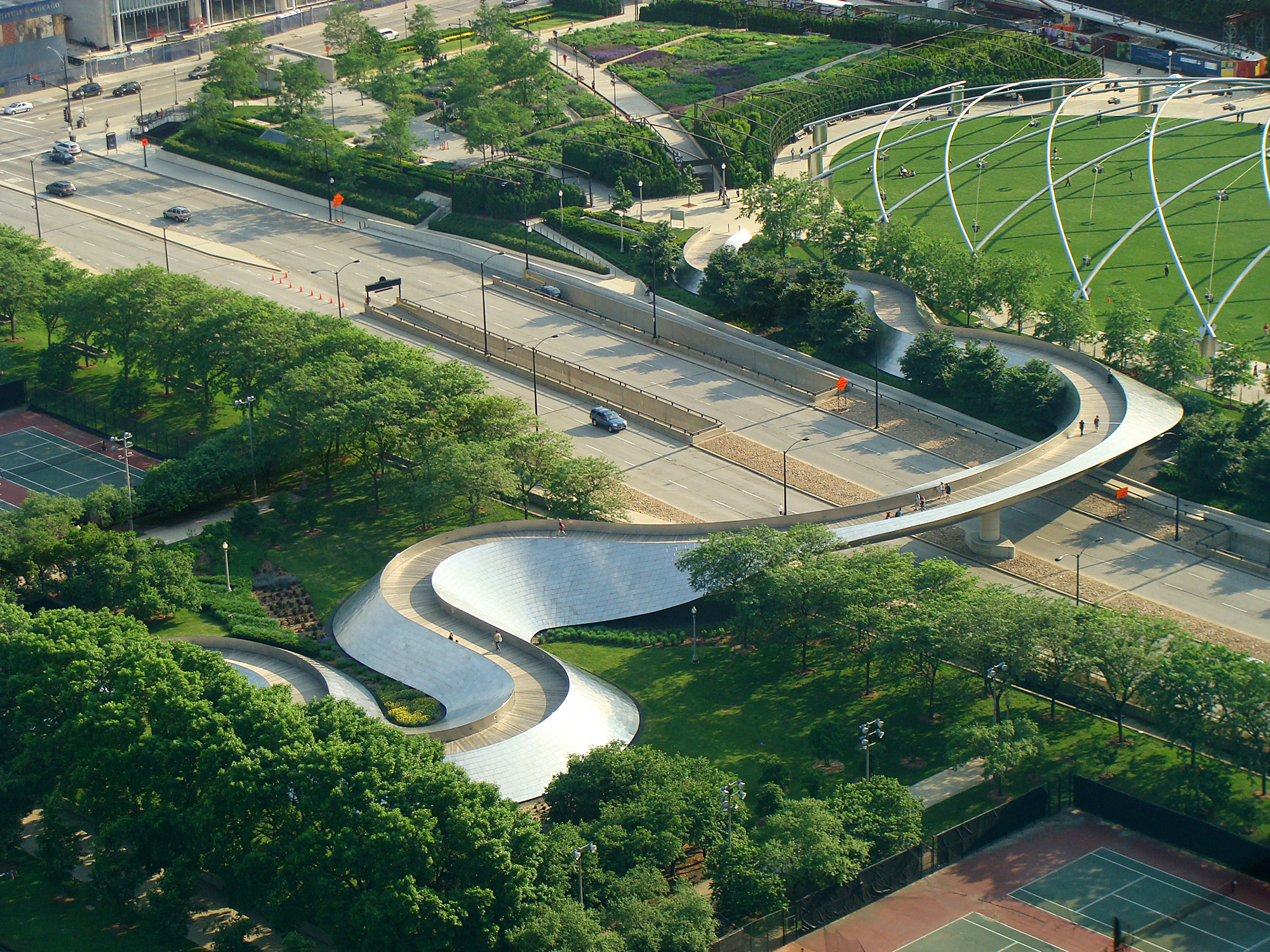
The Frank Gehry–designed BP bridge in Chicago was built for pedestrians.

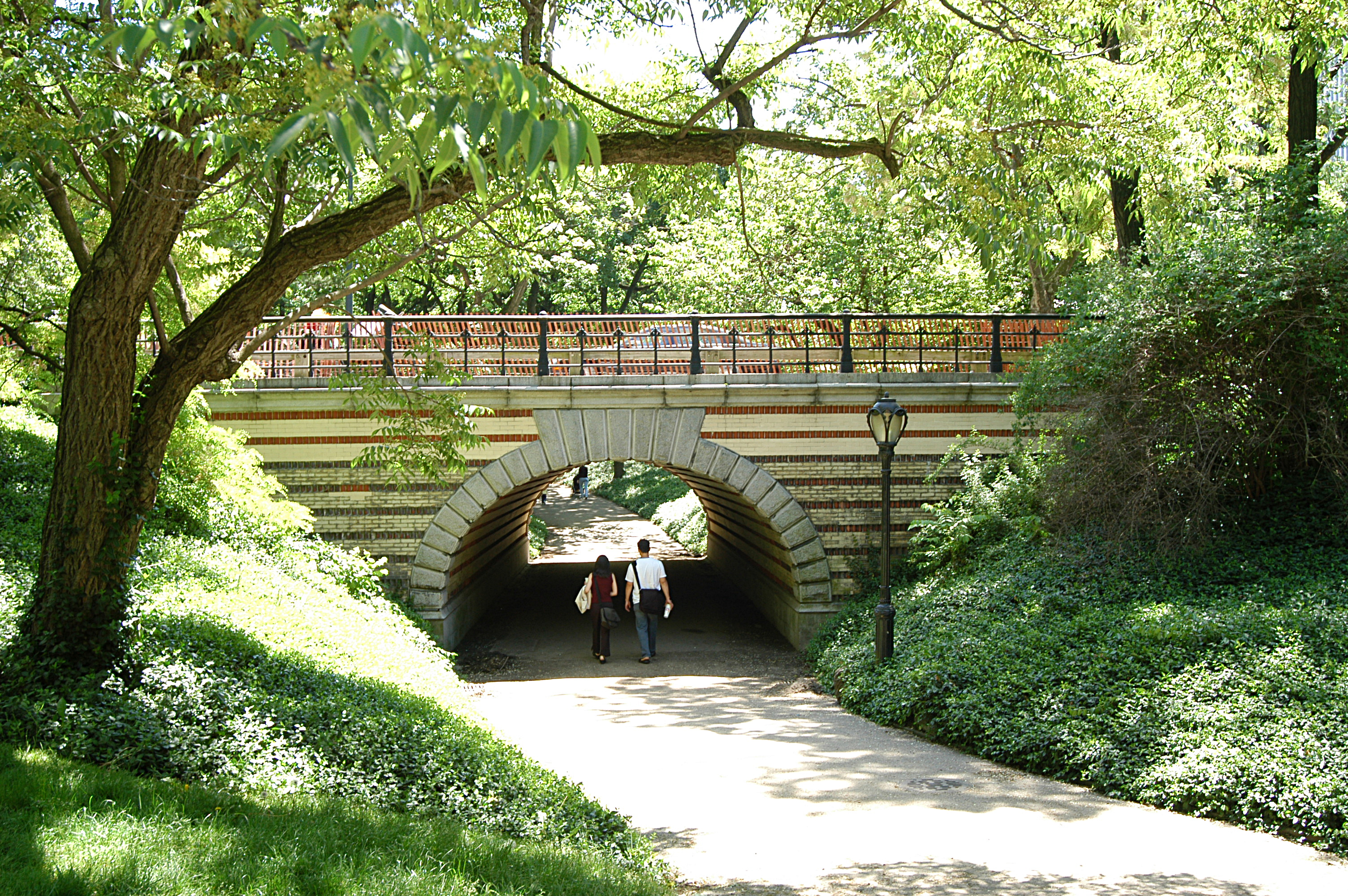
Nineteenth-century pedestrian underpass in Central Park
