= Flange-bearing frog =

Railway switch device

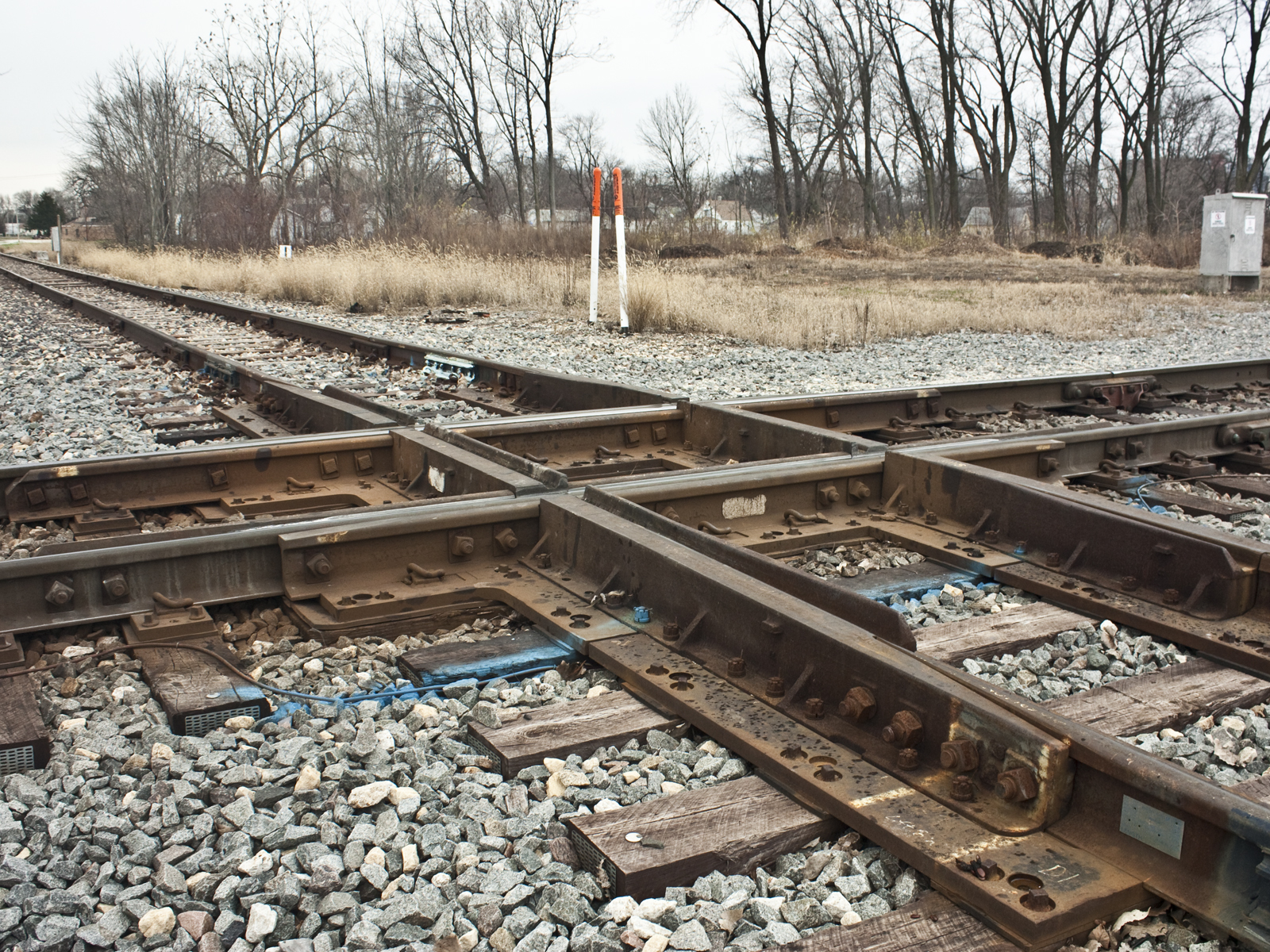
A one-way low-speed (OWLS) diamond in Champaign, Illinois. This is an example of flange-bearing frogs in use on North American freight rail lines.

A flange-bearing frog, often abbreviated FBF, is a type of frog in which the flange of the wheel on a railway vehicle supports the weight of the vehicle. In conventional practice, the tread of the wheel rests on the head of the rail and bears the weight of the vehicle, while the flange is used to keep the vehicle in the gauge of the track. Modern flange-bearing frogs for use in freight railroad applications are a relatively recent development as a means to reduce maintenance costs associated with turnouts and diamonds, where rails must cross one another.

== History ==
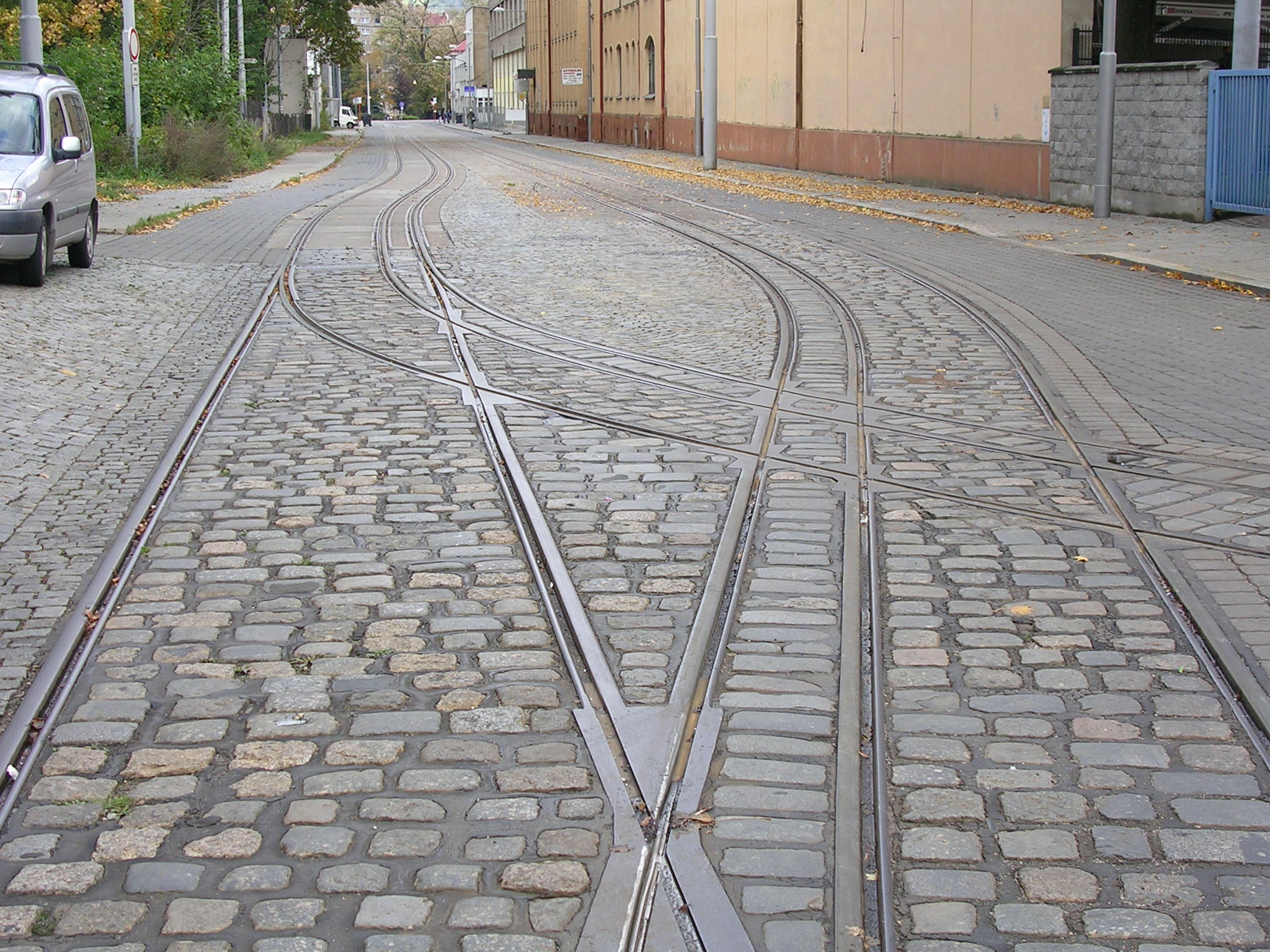
Flange-bearing frog (bottom, center) used in street railway trackage in Liberec, Czech Republic. Note the polishing in the flangeway indicating contact with the wheel flange.

Flange-bearing frogs have been used by street railways for more than 200 years as a means of reducing noise pollution in populated urban settings. In 1995, Robert Willow filed a patent in the United States adapting this concept for use in mainline freight and passenger service. The patent describes the technology as, "designed to support a railroad wheel to roll through the frog on its flange rather than requiring its tread to jump across a flangeway gap."

== Design ==
Ramps are placed on either side of the frog to gradually transition the wheel load from the tread (known as tread-bearing loading mode) to the flange (known as flange-bearing loading mode) and to lift the wheel so that the tread is completely clear of the rail.

=== Advantages over conventional frogs ===
Conventional frogs require a gap of around 2 inches (51 mm) in the running surface of the rail to allow adequate clearance for the flange of a railroad wheel. When a wheel in tread-bearing mode encounters this gap at high speed, it generates high dynamic loading (particularly impact loading) on the edge of the rail at the gap. The repeated application of this impact leads to significant metal fatigue and eventual failure of the frog components, which translate directly to increased maintenance costs, train delays to allow for repairs, and an overall reduced lifespan for the frog and the track structure.

Because the flange rides on a continuous surface in a fully flange-bearing mode, the impact loads generated by the flangeway gap of conventional frogs are eliminated. This reduces maintenance and extends the life of the frog, which leads to an operational cost savings that exceeds the increase in initial costs, when compared to conventional frogs. As previously mentioned, flange-bearing frogs are quieter than conventional frogs—again, because of the reduced impact loads—which provides a potential benefit when implemented near residential areas.

== Types of flange-bearing applications ==
Several types of flange-bearing frogs have been developed for specific applications on North American railroads. These frogs may be flange-bearing in one or both legs of the frog, and may by used either as part of a turnout or as part of a diamond.

=== Lift or jump frog ===
Lift frogs are used in turnouts where the through (straight) route is heavily used, and the diverging (curved) route is only used on occasion and at low speed. The frog is tread-bearing, with a normal rail surface, on the through route, and is flange-bearing on the diverging route. The name is derived from the wheel on the diverging rail being lifted over the through rail. No guard rail is required on the through route, but is critical on the diverging route to keep rail vehicles in gauge. Common applications are set-out tracks or lightly used industry tracks (both of which are special types of sidings diverging from high-speed, high-tonnage mainlines.)

=== Combination tread- and flange-bearing frog ===
Combination tread- and flange-bearing frogs are used in turnouts and are designed to account for various stages of wheel wear (in which the tread of the wheel will wear thin, effectively increasing the flange height):

- When the frog is new, all wheels will cross the frog in a fully flange-bearing mode, with no contact between tread and frog.
- As the frog is used, the flangeway will abrade against the wheel flanges and deepen. In this case, new wheels (those with shorter flanges) will make contact between tread and frog, creating a combination tread- and flange-bearing loading on the frog. Meanwhile, worn wheels (those with taller flanges) will continue to impart a fully flange-bearing loading onto the frog.
- As the frog continues to be used, the flangeway will deepen further until new wheels will cross the frog in a fully tread-bearing mode, while worn wheels will cross the frog in a combination tread- and flange-bearing mode.

It is worth noting that as the tread-bearing loading environments begin to manifest themselves, the same impact loads which cause trouble with conventional frogs will return. They are almost exclusively found in rail yards, where rail vehicles operate at or below 10 miles per hour (16 km/h), due to the reduction of guidance keeping the vehicles in the gauge through the turnout.

=== One-way low-speed diamonds ===
One-way low-speed diamond frogs are used in diamond crossings, often referred to as OWLS diamonds. These types of frogs are analogous to lift frogs in turnouts: the higher-trafficked line crosses the diamond on a normal rail surface in tread-bearing mode, and the lower-trafficked line crosses over the higher-trafficked line in flange-bearing mode. Because there is no flangeway gap to cross on the higher-trafficked line, vehicles using this line can cross the diamonds at the maximum speed allowed by the track design. Because the lower-trafficked line is in a situation where gauge restraint is reduced and because it has to cross over the flangeway gap for the higher-trafficked line, vehicles using this line are limited to speeds at or below 10 miles per hour (16 km/h). OWLS diamonds are commonly used where a rail line with very little traffic operating at low speed crosses a rail line with considerably more traffic operating at higher speeds.

=== Full flange-bearing diamonds ===
Full flange-bearing diamond frogs are also used in diamond crossings. These frogs are flange-bearing for both lines through the diamond. Because both lines are flange-bearing, there is no need to elevate the flanges of vehicles using one line, as there is in the case of OWLS diamond frogs, which allows for greater gauge restraint. Consequently, vehicles can cross these frogs at the maximum speed allowed by the track design; regardless of which line on which they cross the diamond. Though there are very few of these in use today, full flange-bearing diamonds can be found where two high-speed or high-tonnage main lines must cross one another at-grade.

== Regulatory landscape ==
In an effort to regulate the depth of flangeways in a crossing frog, the US Federal Railroad Administration (FRA) created rules which, by definition, prohibited (in the United States) the use of flange-bearing frogs on track with speed limits greater than 10 miles per hour (16 km/h). Because of this, an FRA waiver is required to install full flange-bearing diamonds. Subsequent to installation, an extensive battery of inspections of both the diamond itself, and rail vehicles which cross the diamond, to ensure that safety is not compromised by the installation of such a diamond. This may change, as FBF becomes a proven technology, but the rigorous inspections are a deterrent for widespread installation of full flange-bearing diamonds.

== Implementation ==
In 2006, CSX installed a full flange-bearing diamond at Shelby, Ohio, the first application of this technology on a North American freight railroad. In 2008, BNSF Railway installed two such diamonds at Moorhead, Minnesota. Both installations are under FRA-mandated inspection, as described above. In September 2009, BNSF installed three combination tread- and flange-bearing frogs in their Lafayette, Louisiana yard. Since installation, the frogs have worn as described above, and there is evidence that some wheels already cross the frog in a combination tread- and flange-bearing mode. As of spring 2010, BNSF had installed more than 100 lift frogs across their system. As of spring 2010, BNSF had installed 22 OWLS diamonds on its system; as of December 2008, CSX had installed 13.

== Results ==
Though tests are still ongoing, results in both controlled environments and revenue service are promising. The Transportation Technology Center in Pueblo, Colorado, has installed an OWLS diamond on their property, where they perform research for various railroad entities. Their results show that dynamic loads from a train crossing an OWLS diamond are half the loads from the same train crossing a conventional diamond at half the speed it crossed the OWLS diamond. The inspections of both track and vehicles by BNSF and CSX at their full flange-bearing diamonds have shown no unexpected wear, and suggest that such diamonds could be implemented on a larger scale.

== See also ==
- Level junction (diamond)
- Railroad switch (turnout)
- Swingnose crossing
