= Double junction =

Railway junction with two tracks

Double junction, or level junction (left hand running)

A double junction is a railway junction where a double-track railway splits into two double track lines. Often, one line is the main line and carries traffic through the junction at normal speed, while the other track is a branch line that carries traffic through the junction at reduced speed.

A number of configurations are possible.

== Types ==
Principal double junction configurations with right-hand running

- Diamond – Most double junctions are of this type. Consists of two switches, and a diamond crossing where the opposite tracks meet. Because the switches in this arrangement are close together, the entire junction can be controlled by the mechanical point rodding of a single signal box.
- Ladder – Instead of a diamond, two switches are used. This can improve speed, as the intersecting tracks are able to meet at a finer angle. This type may also be built when adding a second track to a single lead junction.
- Single-lead – The branching line merges into a single track for the duration of the junction, before returning to double track. This type may be chosen over a ladder type due to having fewer switches on the mainline, saving on maintenance.
- Grade separated – Instead of a diamond, a bridge or tunnel is used to eliminate the crossing altogether. This removes unnecessary merging conflicts, improving both safety and throughput.

== Safety ==
Because double junctions contain a merging conflict as well as a crossing conflict, there is risk of a collision if train runs a red signal. This risk can be partially mitigated by never having both switches point towards the crossing at the same time, but collisions are still possible.

Single lead junctions are higher risk than other types due to the possibility of two trains colliding head-on on the branching line.

Grade separated junctions contain fewer conflicts, and are thus lower risk than other types.

Systems independent of the junction design can also be implemented, such as ATP and Train stop.

== See also ==
- Glasgow Bellgrove rail accident – Rail accident caused in part by the decision to install a single lead junction
- Grand union
- Harmelen train disaster – Rail accident caused by overrunning a signal at a ladder type junction
- Junction (rail)
- Level junction, also known as flat crossing
- Swingnose crossing – Frog design which can improve speed on diamond type junctions
