= Swingnose crossing =

Type of train guidance mechanism

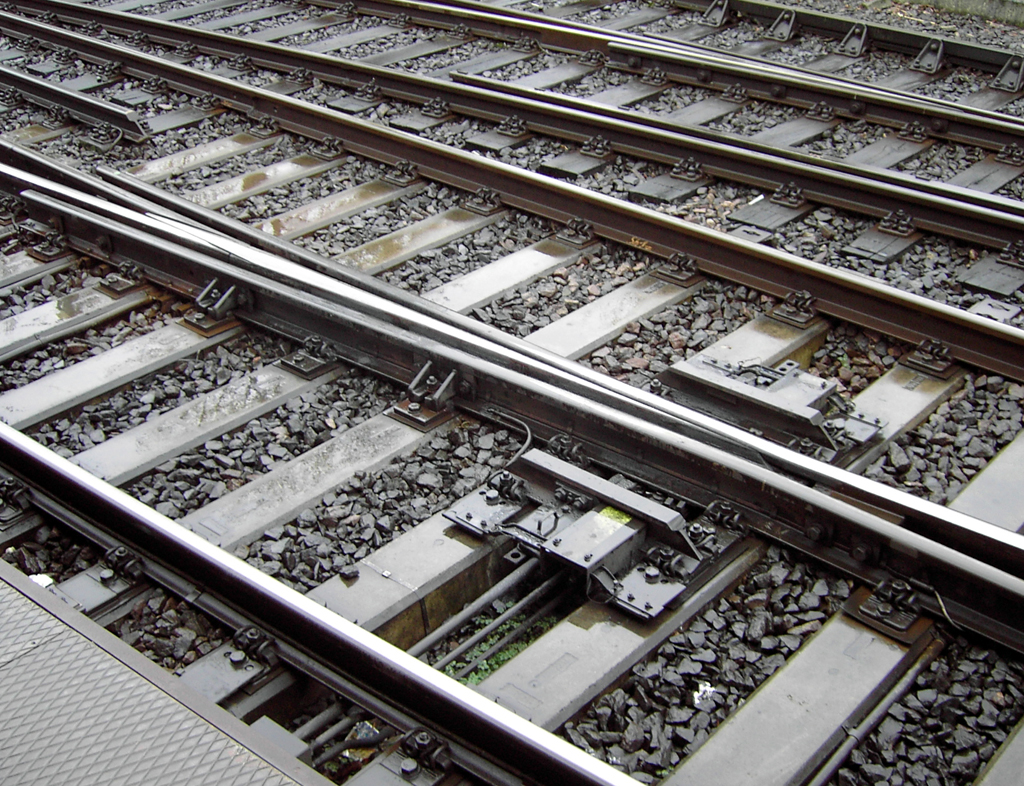
A swingnose crossing at Bonn Hauptbahnhof

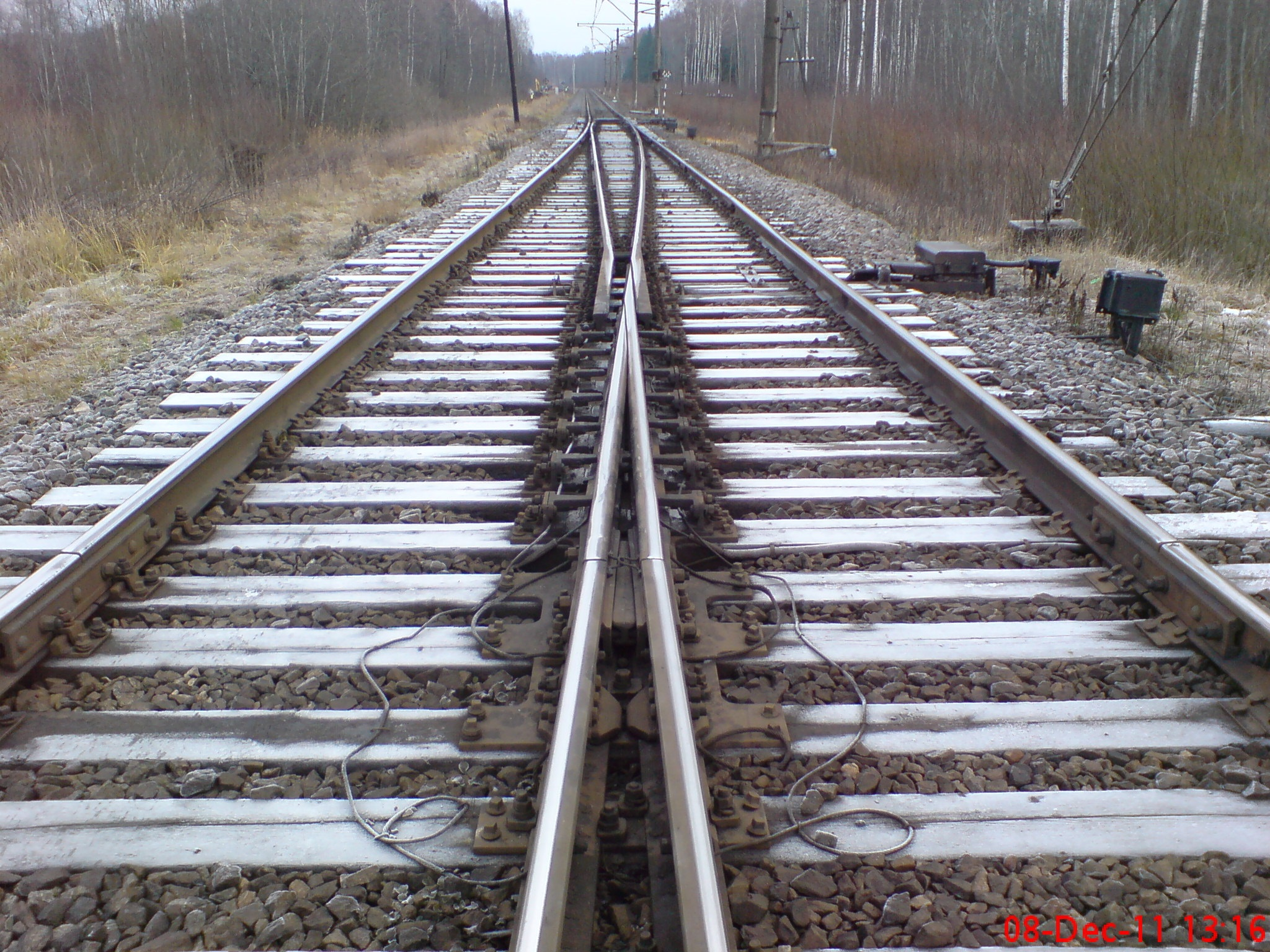
Swingnose crossing at a switch set for the diverging line

A swingnose crossing or moveable point frog is a device used at a railroad switch to eliminate the gap at the common crossing (a.k.a. frog) which can cause damage and noise.

== Fixed crossing ==
On a fixed railway crossing, the wheels need only drift by a small angle, say 1 in 20, before the vehicle may start to go in the wrong direction at the V of a V-crossing. This problem can limit the maximum speed of vehicles using the crossing.

In addition, the open gap at a fixed V-crossing forms a weak point on the railway line where the heavily loaded wheel must bump across the resulting gap of about 10 cm (4 in), supported only by the portion of the wheel tread which is on the wing rail. This pounds the rail so much that the steel can deform and/or wear away. This damage may easily spread to other components including the wheels, and the noise can be a nuisance. Scheduling repair of damage can also be a problem in high traffic locations.

Swingnose crossing in straight traffic position

Swingnose crossing in diverging traffic position

Swingnose crossings virtually eliminate the gap at V-crossings allowing for higher vehicle speeds.

The swingnose crossing overcomes the problem of the gap by moving the point of the V-crossing from side to side, synchronised with the selected direction of the turnout. The wheels are supported the entire way on their treads, and do not produce noise and vibration that would otherwise occur.

Swingnose crossings are also useful where heavy rail and light rail vehicles, which have different wheel profiles, share the same track.

== Swingwing crossing ==
A variety of swingnose crossing, suitable for locations where a branch line turns off a higher-speed line, is the swing wing crossing. In this device, the V-crossing does not need its own motor but is moved by the flange of an approaching wheel on the branch track. It returns to its normal position when the diverging train has passed, pushed by a damped spring.

== Parameters ==
Swingnose crossings would be used for V-crossings finer than about 1 in 20, and for axle loads in excess of 25 tonnes.

== Operation ==
Swingnose crossings need to operate at the same time as the main turnout switches to which they belong. This may require excessive effort for manual operation, and require a point motor. The main turnout and the swingnose crossing will require separate machines.

== Switched diamond ==
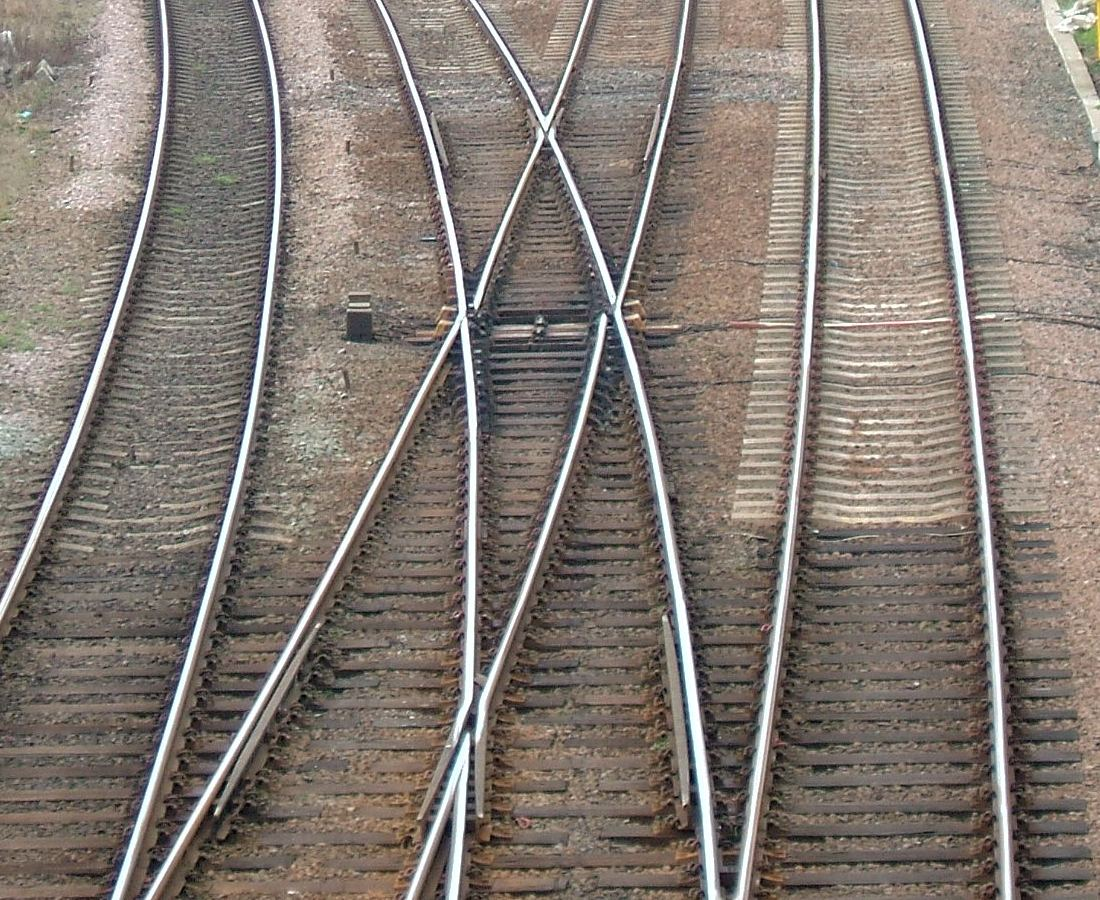
A switched diamond at a junction in the UK

A switched diamond is a diamond crossing in which the fixed frogs are replaced by moveable frogs.

== See also ==
- Flange-bearing frog
