= Forbrugsforeningen =

Organization

Forbrugsforeningen (The Consumption Society), also called FBF, is Denmark's oldest and largest loyalty club with more than 247,500 members. FBF is a non-profit organisation, that was established 20 April 1886 as Forbrugsforeningen af 1886.

FBF's product is a combined loyalty card and credit card to be used in shops and webshops to earn and accumulate bonuses, also called cashback. The size of bonuses varies from shop to shop. To become a member of FBF, one has to be a member of a trade union. There is a small membership fee.

== Awards ==
FBF won the title as best loyaltyclub in Denmark in 2015 and again in 2023, primarily due to the ease of transparency when accumulating bonuses, regular cashbacks without a minimum amount. And because their members in more than 75% of cases shop purposefully at the affiliated stores. A score that makes them second to none among the 20 largest loyalty clubs in Denmark.
