= Level junction =

Type of railway junction

Flat junction: trains have to wait to cross the 'diamond' at the center

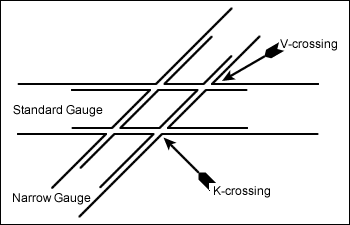
A schematic diagram of a dual gauge diamond crossing

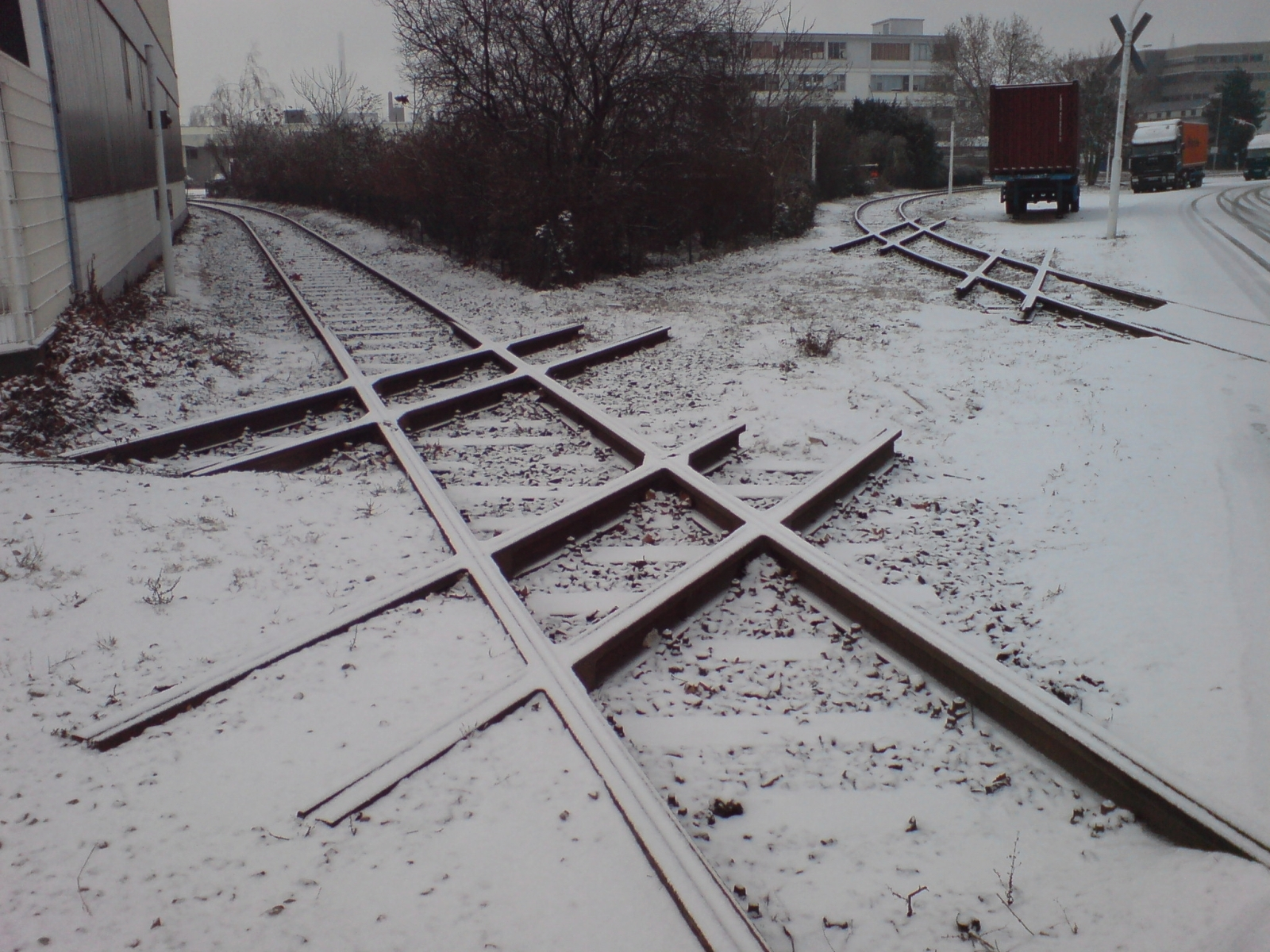
Several diamond crossings (now obsolete after removal of one track direction) in the Port of Mainz, Germany

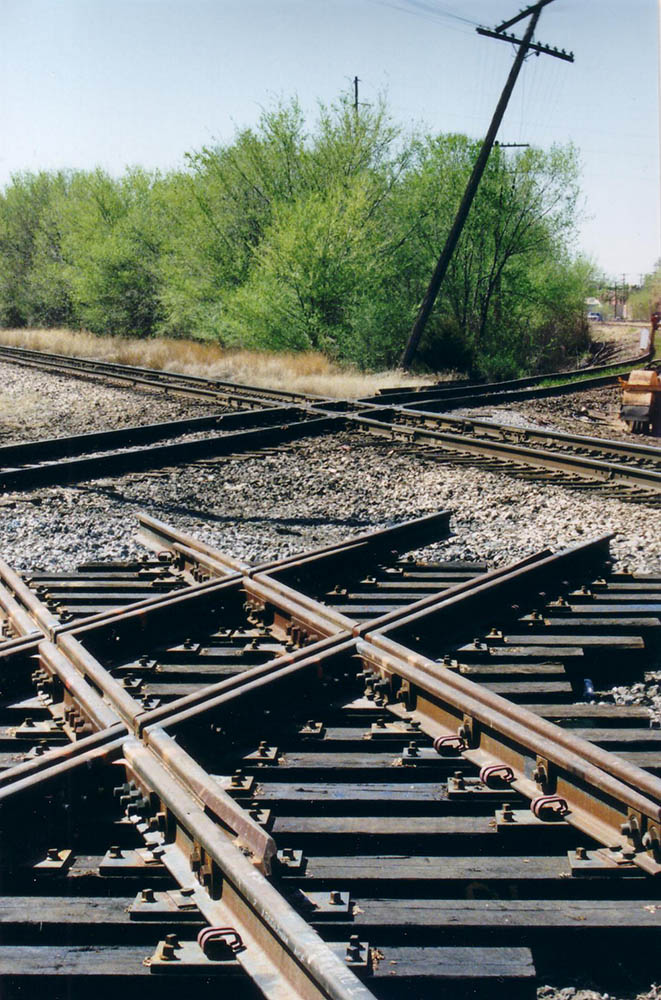
A fully assembled level junction used where the Union Pacific and Kansas & Oklahoma tracks cross

A level junction (or in the United Kingdom a flat crossing) is a railway junction that has a track configuration in which merging or crossing railroad lines provide track connections with each other that require trains to cross over in front of opposing traffic at grade (i.e. on the level).

The cross-over structure is sometimes called a diamond junction or diamond crossing in reference to the diamond-shaped center. The two tracks need not necessarily be of the same gauge. A diamond crossing is also used as a component of a double junction, like the one illustrated on the right.

The opposite of a level junction is a flying junction, where individual tracks rise or fall to pass over or under other tracks.

== Risks ==
Conflicting routes must be controlled by interlocked signals to prevent collisions.

Level junctions, particularly those of fine angles or near right angles, create derailment risks and impose speed restrictions. The former can occur as the flanges of the wheels are momentarily unsupported and unguided and can slip through the gaps in the rails, and the latter because the assembly contains elements that can break or vibrate loose.

Level junctions are considered a maintenance issue by railroad companies as the inherent gaps tend to be hard on locomotive and rolling stock wheelsets. Switched diamonds partially solve these problems, but introduce new ones.

== Examples ==
Flat crossings are particularly common in the United States where the lines of one company cross the lines of another company, and there is no particular need for the lines to be connected for through traffic.

Some examples of two tracks crossing another two tracks:

- At Rochelle Railroad Park in the United States, the double track Union Pacific Railroad main line crosses the double track BNSF Railway main line forming four diamond crossings altogether at this location.
- At Nagpur, India. Nagpur is where trunk railway lines running from Kolkata in the Eastern end of India to Mumbai in the Western end, and the one from Delhi in the Northern end to Chennai and other places in the southern end cross. The double lines crossing from the North to the South and those from East to West form a set of four diamonds. This type is also called as "True Diamond Crossing".
- At Newark flat crossing in the United Kingdom, where the East Coast Main Line and Nottingham to Lincoln Line cross. This is the fastest flat-crossing in the UK, with trains travelling north-south allowed to cross the junction at 100 mph (160 km/h). Protection of the junction is controlled by signalling.
- Grafton, Ohio SR57 at Cleveland St

=== Local transport ===
Chicago Transit Authority control tower 18 level junction
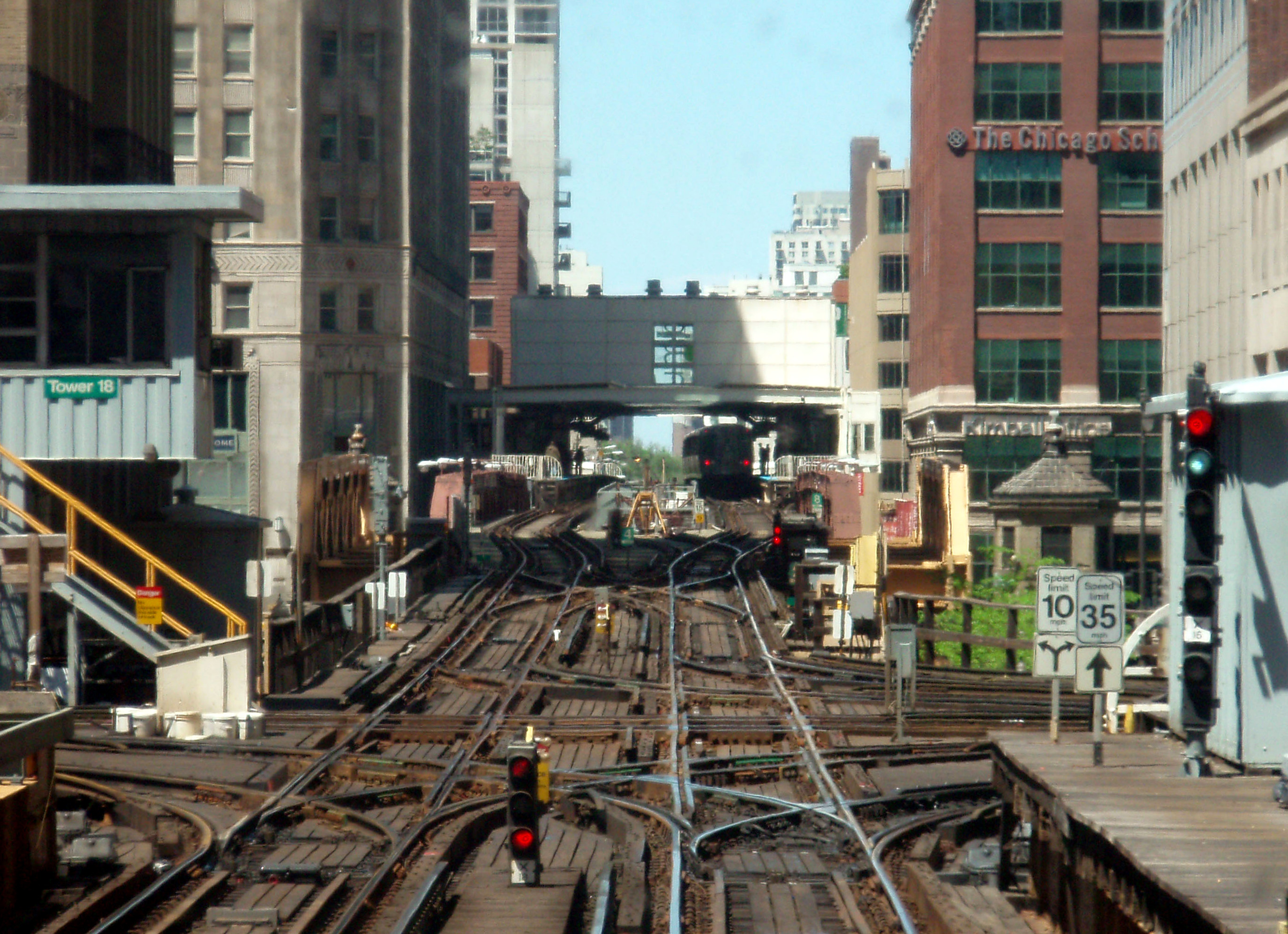
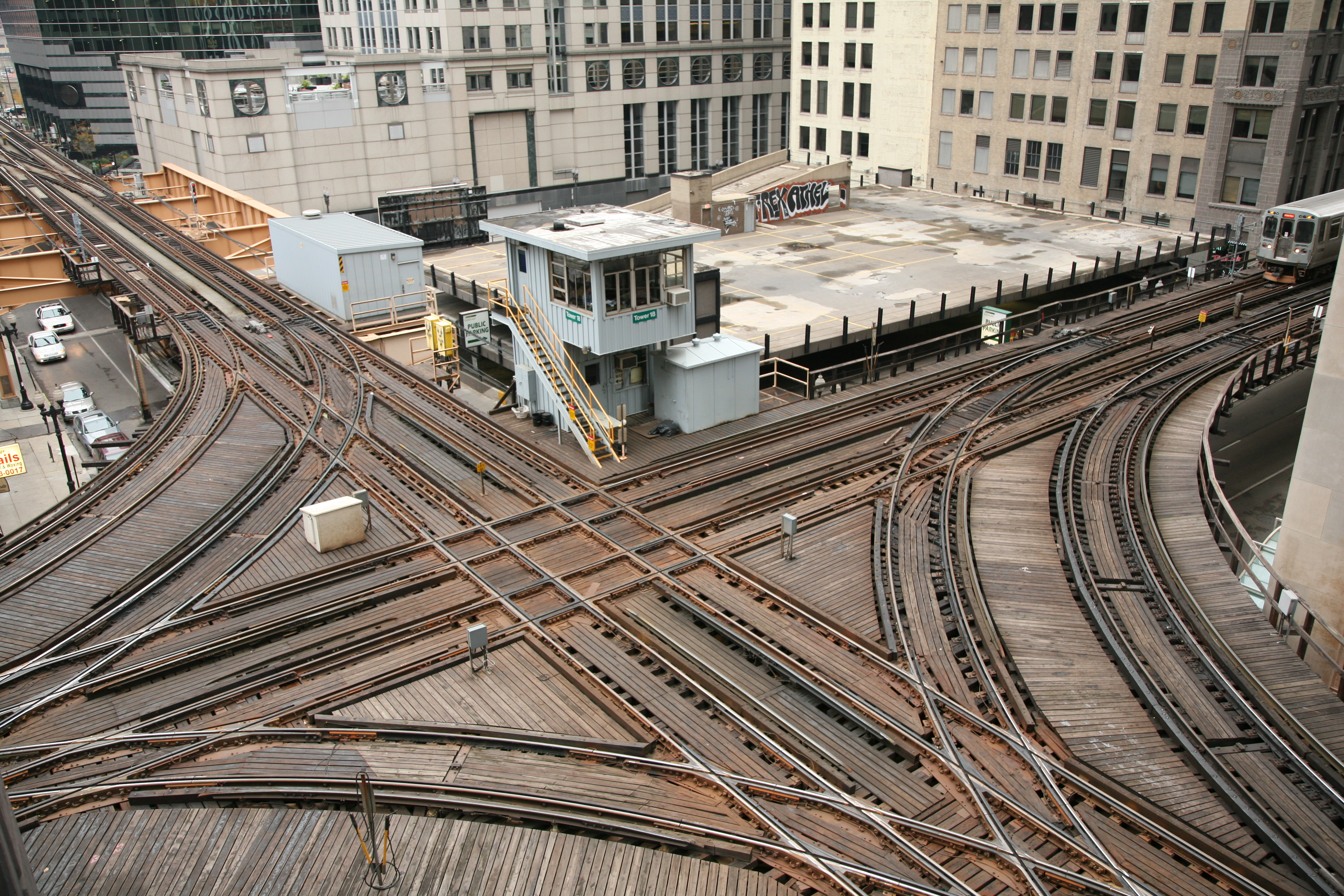
A pair of level junction interlaced turnouts at Chicago Transit Authority control tower 18 on the elevated Chicago "L" north and southbound Purple and Brown lines intersecting with east and westbound Pink and Green lines and the looping Orange line above the Wells and Lake street intersection in the loop.

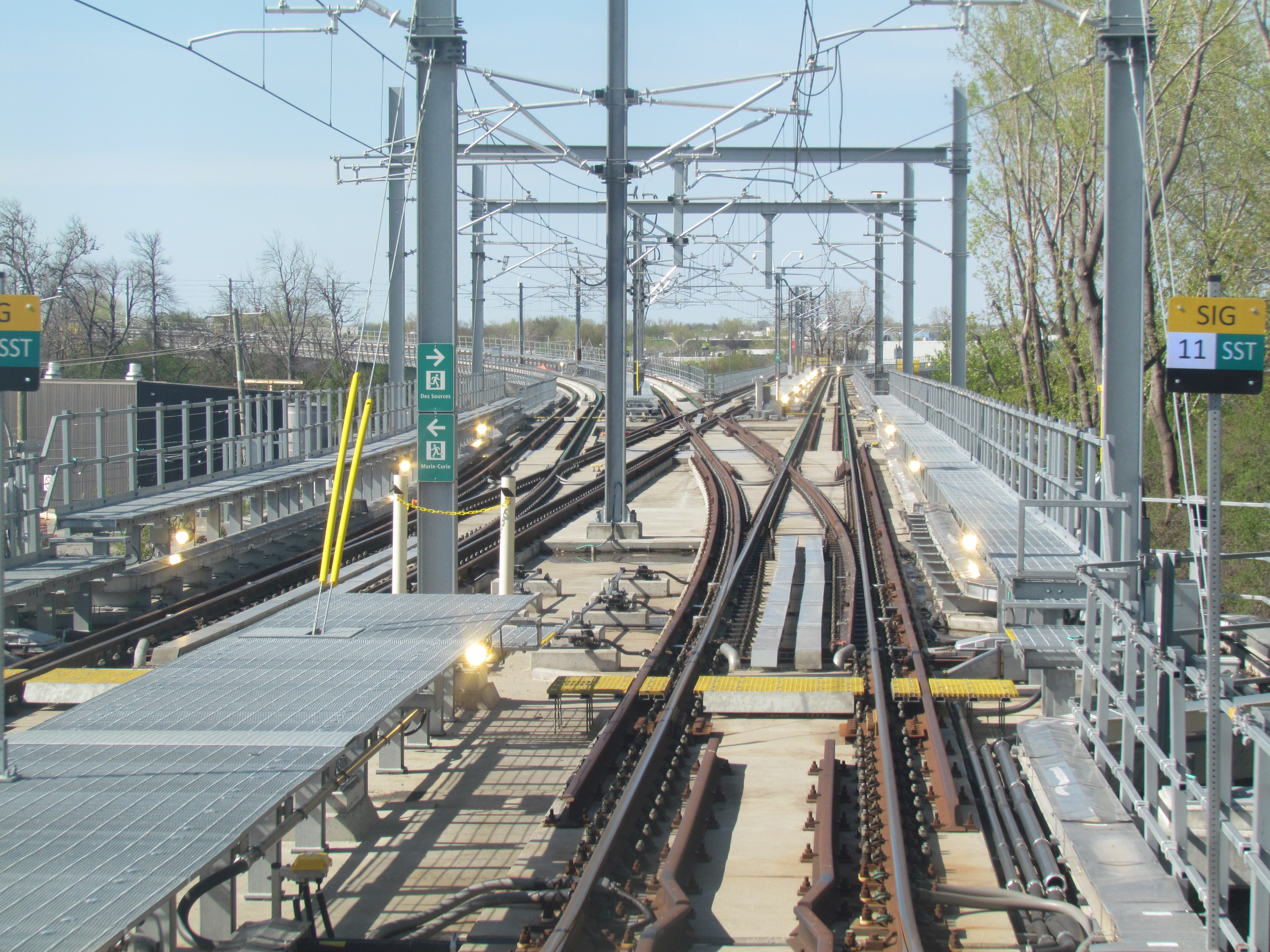
A flat junction with a switched diamond, between the Montreal REM Airport and Anse-à-l'Orme branches.

Flat crossings appear in some urban passenger rail systems, which can cause delays at peak hours as a train heading in one direction may have to wait for trains heading in another direction to clear the junction before it can cross. The junctions leading onto and off from the Loop of the Chicago "L" are examples of this problem. The New York City Subway system mostly uses flying junctions, but in a few older parts of the system, flat crossings can still cause delays. Examples include the 142nd Street Junction and the Myrtle Avenue junction.

Level junctions are often found on tram or streetcar networks where lines cross or split. The MBTA in Boston has two of these underground on the Green Line, one where the E Line departs the central subway just west of Copley Station, and another where the C Line and D Line split west of Kenmore Station. While the latter crossing rarely causes delays, the former is at an intersection of four lines and cars often have to wait for others to pass at peak hours. Earlier such splits in Boston (such as the disused crossing west of Boylston Station) were built as flying junctions, but the two level splits were built as level junctions mostly to save money.

=== Different gauges ===
A diamond crossing between 1,435 mm (4 ft 8 1/2 in) standard gauge and 1,600 mm (5 ft 3 in), broad gauge exists at Ararat in Victoria, Australia.

At Porthmadog, in the United Kingdom, there is a flat-crossing between the single track standard gauge Cambrian Line and the narrow-gauge Welsh Highland Railway (1 ft 11 1/2 in or 597 mm, also single track).

In Darby, Pennsylvania, USA, the SEPTA Route 11 line, using Pennsylvania trolley gauge of 5 ft 2 1/2 in (1,588 mm), crosses CSX Transportation using standard gauge.

In South Bay, San Diego at the South Bay Salt Works, as of 2001, survives the only crossing of narrow gauge track with standard gauge track, formerly utilized by the San Diego and Arizona Eastern Railway, in the United States.

In Sofia, Bulgaria, there are two diamond crossings between tracks of the Sofia tramway and a standard gauge railway line that connects Zaharna fabrika station with Zemlyane thermal power plant. One crossing is at Aleksandar Stamboliyski boulevard where the railway line crosses narrow gauge tram routes 8 and 10. The other is at Vazkresenie boulevard where it crosses tram routes 11 and 22. This second crossing is rather unique, as the tram track there is dual gauge. Route 11 uses narrow gauge while route 22 uses standard gauge. The railway line is rarely used, however. Most recently it saw use during the 2009 Gas Crisis when Zemlyane TPP temporarily switched from burning natural gas to burning mazut, which was delivered to the power plant by train. In addition, the Sofia tramway has three diamond crossings between narrow and standard gauge tram tracks.

== Drawbridge crossing ==
In Queensland, Australia, a number of flat crossings between narrow gauge (610 mm (2 ft)) cane tramways and main lines (1,067 mm (3 ft 6 in)) have been replaced by drawbridges so that the rails of the main line are completely unbroken by gaps or weak spots: this allows the main line speeds to be raised.

== See also ==
- Double junction
- Junction (rail)
- Flying junction
