= Electrische Museumtramlijn Amsterdam =

Electrische Museumtramlijn Amsterdam Amsterdam tram line 30
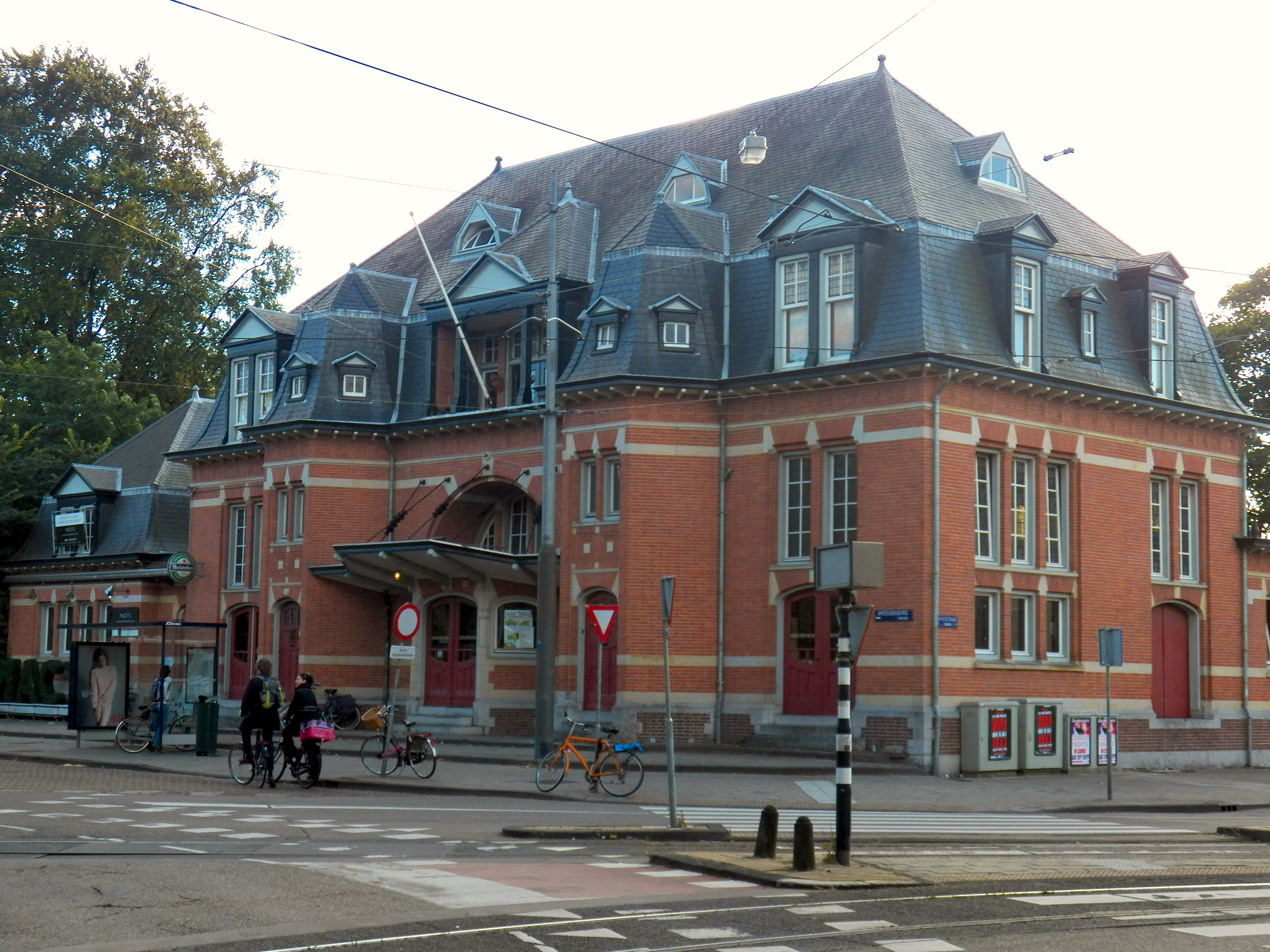
- Haarlemmermeer station, the former northern terminus

Overview
- Locale: Amsterdam
- Termini: Jan Wilsbrug; Bovenkerk

Service
- System: Amsterdam tram
- Route number: 30
- Operator(s): Electrische Museumtramlijn Amsterdam

History
- Opened: 1 May 1915 (as heavy rail); 20 September 1975 (as heritage streetcar)

Technical
- Line length: 7.2 kilometres (4.5 mi)
- Number of tracks: 1-2
- Track gauge: 1,435 mm (4 ft 8 1/2 in)
- Electrification: 600 V DC overhead

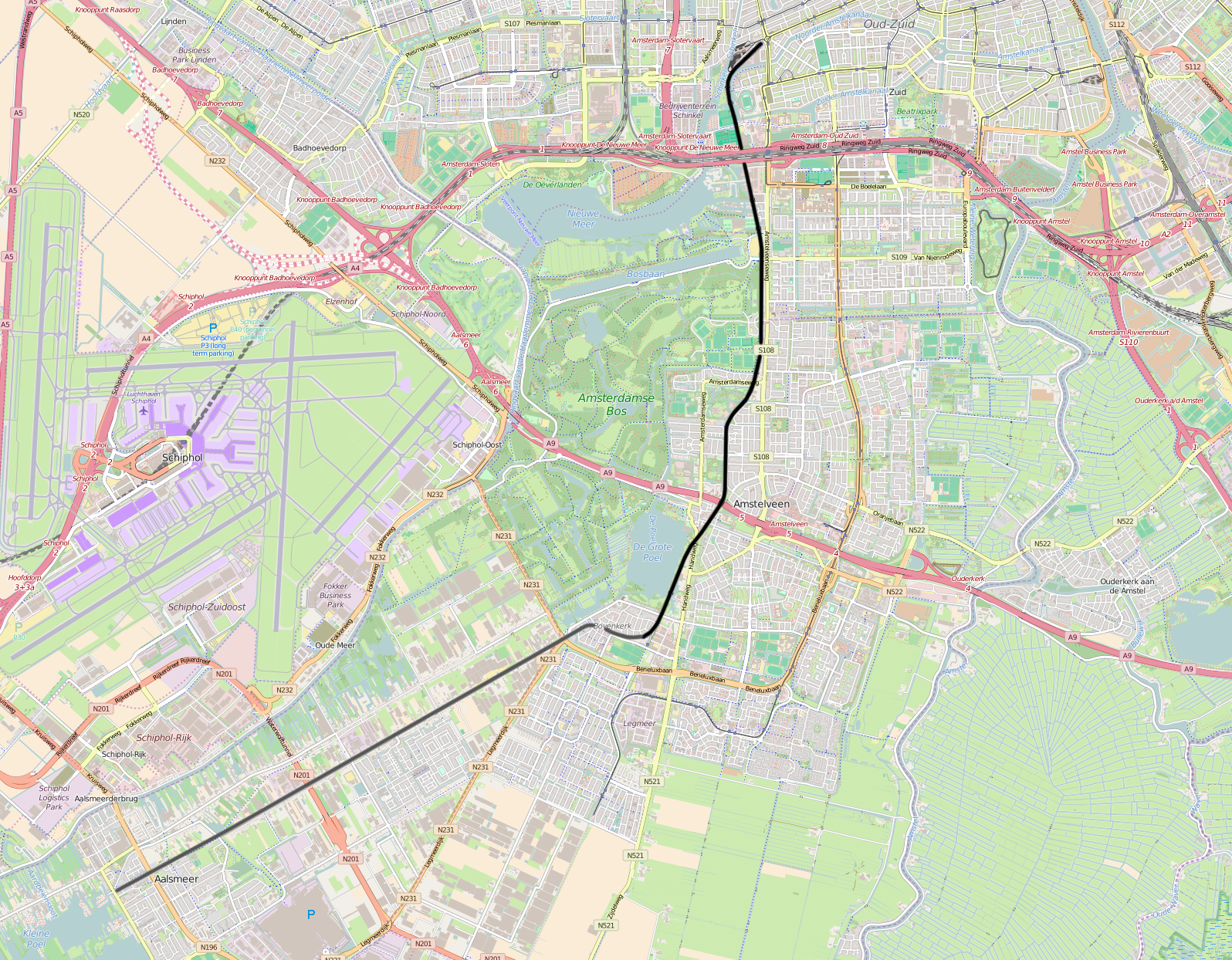
Route from the museum tram line along the Amsterdamse Bos between Haarlemmermeer station – Amstelveen and Bovenkerk Station, as part of the railway to Aalsmeer (bottom left).

Amsterdam tram line 30 (Tramlijn 30) is a museum tram line in Amsterdam serving the following stations: Haarlemmermeer station– Jollenpad – Kalfjeslaan– Amstelveen Station – Bovenkerk Station.

The Electric Tramway Museum Amsterdam (Electrische Museumtramlijn Amsterdam, EMA) is a local railway, which operates historic electric trams between the Haarlemmermeer station, Amstelveen and Bovenkerk. This is the last remaining part of the former Haarlemmermeer railway lines. The Haarlemmermeer station is a national monument. From 26 May 2020, the local railway line on the municipal monument list of Amstelveen, the Amstelveen Station and the houses along the line were already on the Amstelveen monument list.

== History ==
After the end of freight transport on the last functioning part of the Haarlemmermeer railway lines, between Uithoorn and the Haarlemmermeer station, in 1972, several groups proposed repurposing this line as an electric museum tram. In 1975, the Amsterdam transport company gave GVB assistance. The beginning of the Museum tram line was opened on September 20, 1975. There was a need for such a museum tram line in the Netherlands. Although the Hoorn–Medemblik heritage railway already existed, it was not possible to drive electric trams on this line. Various tram material, stored in Hoorn, could not be used. With a separate tram line in Amsterdam, it was not necessary to provide a part of the line from Hoorn to Medemblik with overhead wires. On a site at the Haarlemmermeer station was a company warehouse that could be used as a yard. In February 1974, an Amsterdam motor car and eleven trailer cars were transferred to Amsterdam.

With a view to the celebration of the 75th anniversary of the Amsterdam Municipal Tram and the 700th anniversary of the city of Amsterdam, the GVB provided aid and subsidy was made available by the municipality. The overhead line was built and paid for by the GVB.

== Trams on a branch line ==
The line is a light railway. This can be seen in the signs and signalling along the line. As usual in railway lines, the line is divided into blocks and areas of responsibility. The security on the line is done via a mobile telephone connection, whereby every tram of the tramway is allowed to ride a section. From 1984 the 'Duiventil' was used at the Haarlemmermeer station. The Duiventil stood at stood at the Central Station from 1955 to 1983.

For the service on the museum tram line, old electric trams built between 1904 and 1960 are used, including those from Amsterdam, The Hague, Rotterdam, Zeist, Groningen, Vienna and Prague. The museum tram service is fully maintained by volunteers of the Rijdend Electrisch Tram Museum (RETM) association. In addition to operating the tram line, the maintenance of railway and tram is also done in-house. Since 2008, there has been its own inspection well in the workshop, so that vehicle inspections can also be done in-house. This was previously done in the Havenstraat yard of the GVB Amsterdam.

The tram service is operated between the beginning of April and the end of October on Sundays (and on Easter Monday and Whit Monday) from 11 to 17 hours, where every 20 or 30 minutes is driven. Outside the normal service, several themarits were ridden such as Sinterklaas, Christmas and Oliebollen rides and 'Museumtram by Night'. It is also possible to rent the trams and to get married in the tram, in Amsterdam or in Amstelveen.

== The line with extensions and contractions ==
The museum tram line was opened on September 20, 1975. Initially, a 1,200-metre-long part of the line was driven to the Ringweg Zuid (A10). In the following years, the tram service was gradually extended, after the railway was made suitable for driving with electric trams. To this end, the line was fitted with overhead lines and changeovers and stop platforms were built. The power supply ran through the Havenstraat yard (and from 1983 also via the Kalfjeslaan substation).

On 24 May 1979 the Jollenpad was reached, from 28 May 1981 the tram continued to the Kalfjeslaan, which also stopped at a few stops at the Amsterdamse Bos. On 3 April 1983 the extension to the Amstelveen station came in use. The museum tram line reached a length of 5.7 kilometers. From now on, a twenty-minute service was operated with five trams (tolls). On 5 April 1987, the turn loop was in use at the Haarlemmermeer station. The last extension was that to the Bovenkerk tram stopon 25 April 1997, bringing the total length to 7.2 kilometers. At the end point in Bovenkerk, a wye has been laid out that allows the reversal of uni-directional trams.

In 2017 the driving season ended due to work on the Piet Kranenbergpad at the viaducts of the Ringweg Zuid six weeks earlier, on 10 September. From 17 September to the end of October, eight rides were made between the Haarlemmermeer station and Artis Station with two trams on Sundays between the Haarlemmermeer station and Artis. In the 2018 driving season, from April to September, there were trips between Haarlemmermeer station and IJsbaanpad and from Haarlemmermeer station to Artis. From October 2018 (after more than a year), trips to Amstelveen were offered again, and the season was extended until the end of November. In 2020, the driving season started more than three months later than usual, after the delayed renewal of the track north of the Kalfjeslaan. The tram rode again on Sundays from 19 July, once an hour, only to the Molenweg in Amstelveen. From August 23, there was again with a half-hour service to Bovenkerk. On October 14, 2020, the driving season ended prematurely due to the COVID-19 pandemic.

In February 2021, the museum tram line north of Amstelveen station near the A9 motorway was suspended. The viaduct of the museum tram line over the A9 was closed for the widening of the road. After completion of this, the museum tram line will receive a new route. In March–April 2021, a piece of double track was built north of the construction pit and this double track service as a new change of change and the end point of the tram service during the construction work. Service to Amstelveen and Bovenkerk Station are therefore suspended for about five years. From the start of the 2021 driving season on 13 June 2021, half-hourly service was driven to the Molenweg in Amstelveen; from 4 July 2021, the new parkside area near the A9 motorway will be driven.

Due to demolition and construction work on the Havenstraatterrein at the Haarlemmermeer station, the last tram with passengers departed from the Haarlemmermeer station on 29 October 2023, the last day of the driving season. The starting point of the museum tram line will be moved to the Jollenpad in the coming years, where a temporary warehouse for the storage of the trams has been built.

== Sights along the line ==
In addition to the station buildings Haarlemmermeer station and Amstelveen) there are a number of stops: at the Kalfjeslaan, Karselaan, Handweg, Noorddammerlaan (Upstairs Church) and at the wye in Bovenkerk.

=== Structures transferred from Amsterdam ===
There are also some objects that previously stood elsewhere in Amsterdam, such as the 'Duiventil' behind the Haarlemmermeer station, which stood from 1955 to 1983 opposite the Amsterdam Central Station and the 'Duiventil' at the Van Nijenrodeweg, which stood on the bridge of the Muntplein from the fifties to the eighties. This building, which was used by the Amsterdam traffic police, is a design by the well-known Amsterdam School - architect Piet Kramer, of which a large number of bridges can also be found in the Amsterdamse Bos.

Since 2014, the original statue of the Amsterdam Stedemaagd from 1883 stands next to the Koenenkade stop of the museum tram line. This stood at the entrance of the Vondelpark at the Stadhouderskade until 2010, but was heavily subjected to decay and was replaced by a replica. The old statue was placed on a pedestal on a pedestal on 18 June 2014, at an entrance of the Amsterdamse Bos, near the border with the municipality of Amstelveen.

== Residential construction plans at the Havenstraat site ==
After years of planning, the municipality of Amsterdam decided in March 2018 to build large-scale housing on the site behind the Haarlemmermeer station, the Havenstraatterrein, where the Electric Museumtram Line Amsterdam has been located since 1975. In the new plan, adopted on 14 March 2018, no place was made for a tram yard, nor for the stretch of railway along the Havenstraat to the current end point at the Haarlemmermeer station. Particularly because of the latter, the operation of the Electric Museum tram line threatened to become impossible.

The new zoning plan did include a change authorisation, which meant that the municipality could still allocate parts of the housing location to the railway line and/or a parking building for a limited time. A solid financial plan had to be submitted for this. A petition to maintain the line and trams had already generated more than 15,000 endorsements in mid-June.

On 27 March 2019, the Council of State struck down the zoning plan for the new residential area to be built with 500 homes on the Havenstraatterrein. The municipality had not sufficiently taken into account the interests of the museum tram.

On 3 December 2021, after ten years of planning, an agreement was concluded between the Museum tram line and the municipality of Amsterdam about the construction of a new tramway and a new tram route with a turn loop on the Havenstraatterrein. According to the plans, the project would be carried out between 2023 and 2026.

The last tram with passengers departed from the Haarlemmermeer station on Sunday 29 October 2023, the last day of the season. The starting point of the museum tram line will be moved to the Jollenpad in the coming years.

In March 2024 the 'Havenstraatterrein' was closed with fences as a construction site. The tramway operated at the Karperweg for a few more months, until the replacement temporary tram pilot was built near the Jollenpad. At the beginning of July 2024 the warehouse could be put into use at the Jollenpad, there is room for nine trams. On 7 July the driving season could also start on the tramway at both ends: Jollenpad – Amsterdamseweg. Initially, one tram was swayed in connection with a shuttle bus of the Amsterdam Museum Buses (BRAM) to/from the Haarlemmermeer station. Because the power supply has been interrupted via the CFP, an aggregate has been placed at the Jollenpad that provides the voltage on the overhead line. From 21 July, there could be a half-hour service from the Jollenpad to the Parklaan in Amstelveen.

Between July and October 2024, all buildings were demolished and all rails were broken up, after which the Havenstraat site was made ready to build. After more than fifty years, this has come to an end to the Karperweg draw, the starting point of the Museum tram line. The remaining trams have been transferred to the warehouse on the Jollenpad, the Lekstraat depot and the storage facility in Aalsmeer. In the context of a new residential area, a new tramway shed will be built in a few years.

== Pictures ==
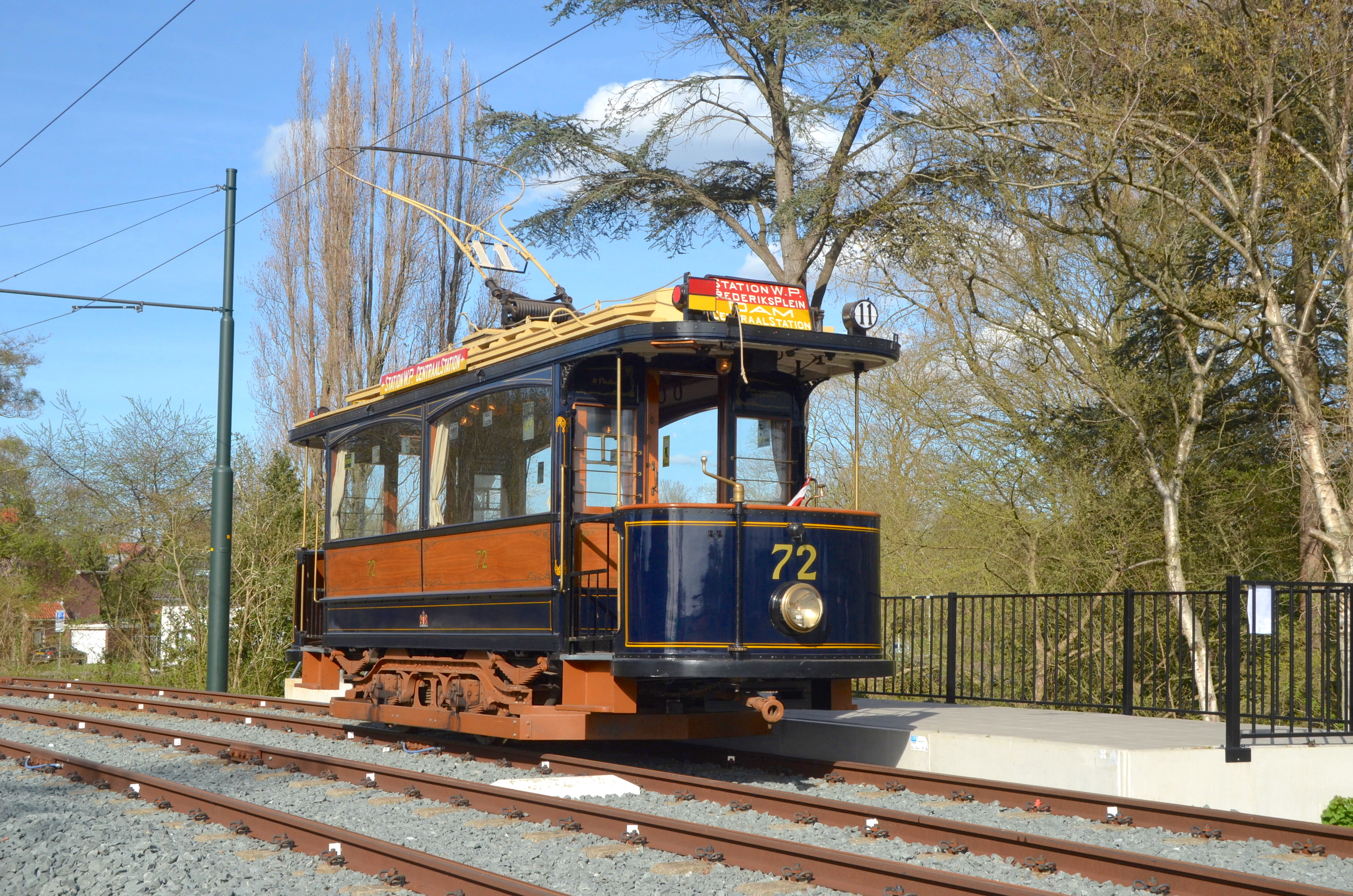
The Amsterdam motor car 72 at the Parklaan (change) in Amstelveen.

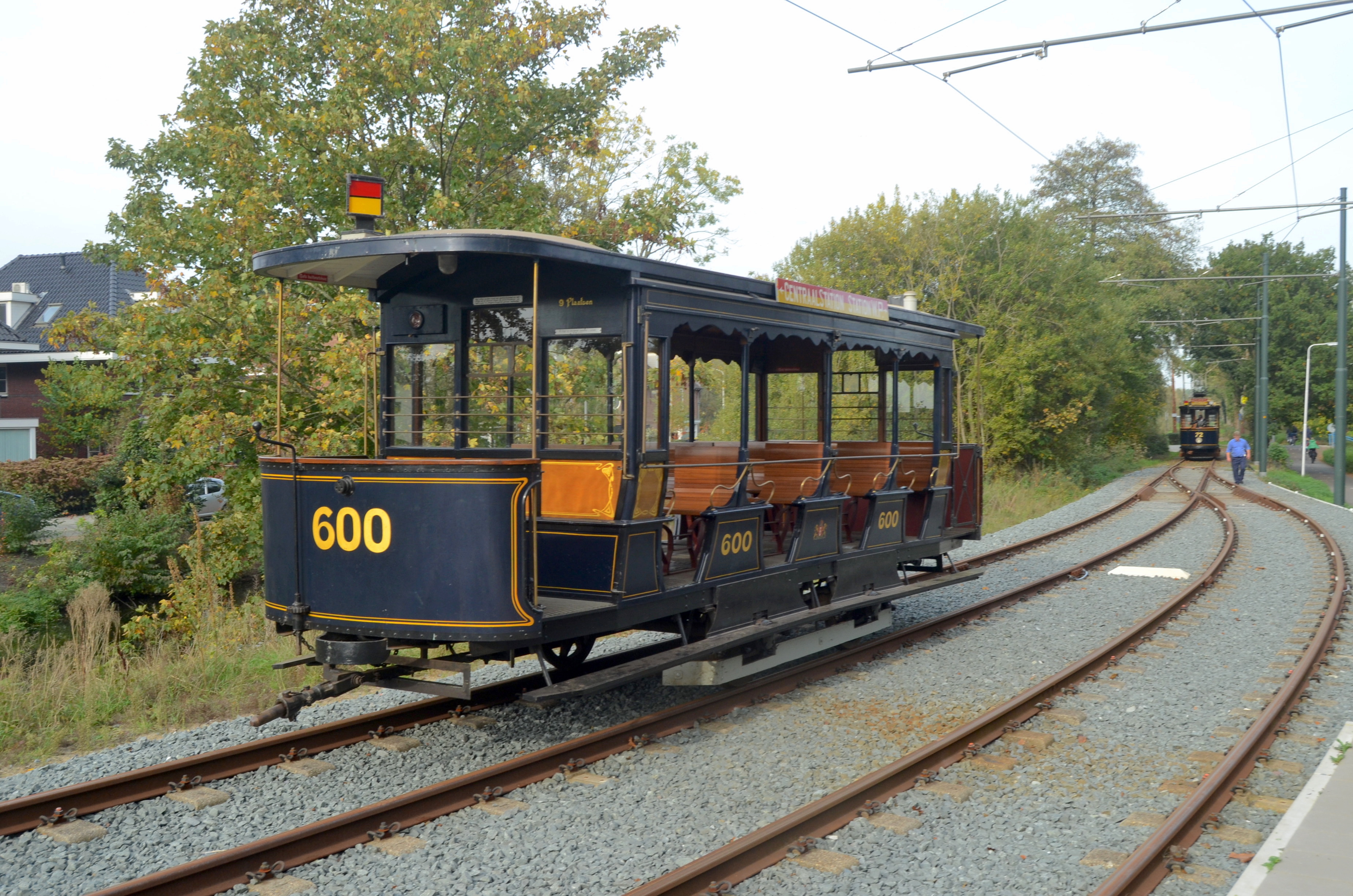
The Amsterdam open by car 600 at the Parklaan (changer) in Amstelveen.

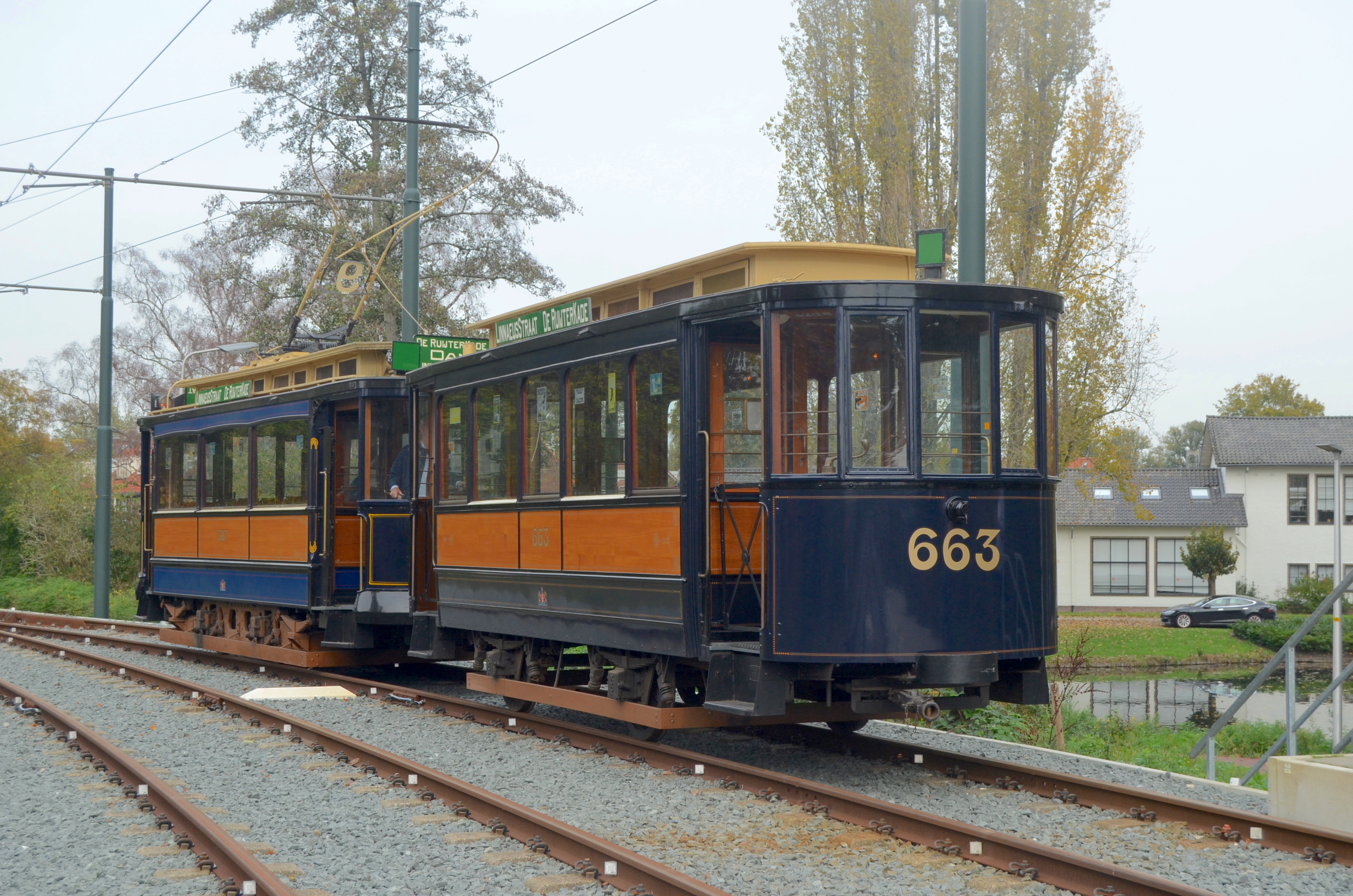
The Amsterdam out-wagon 663 with motor car 307 at the Parklaan (change) in Amstelveen.

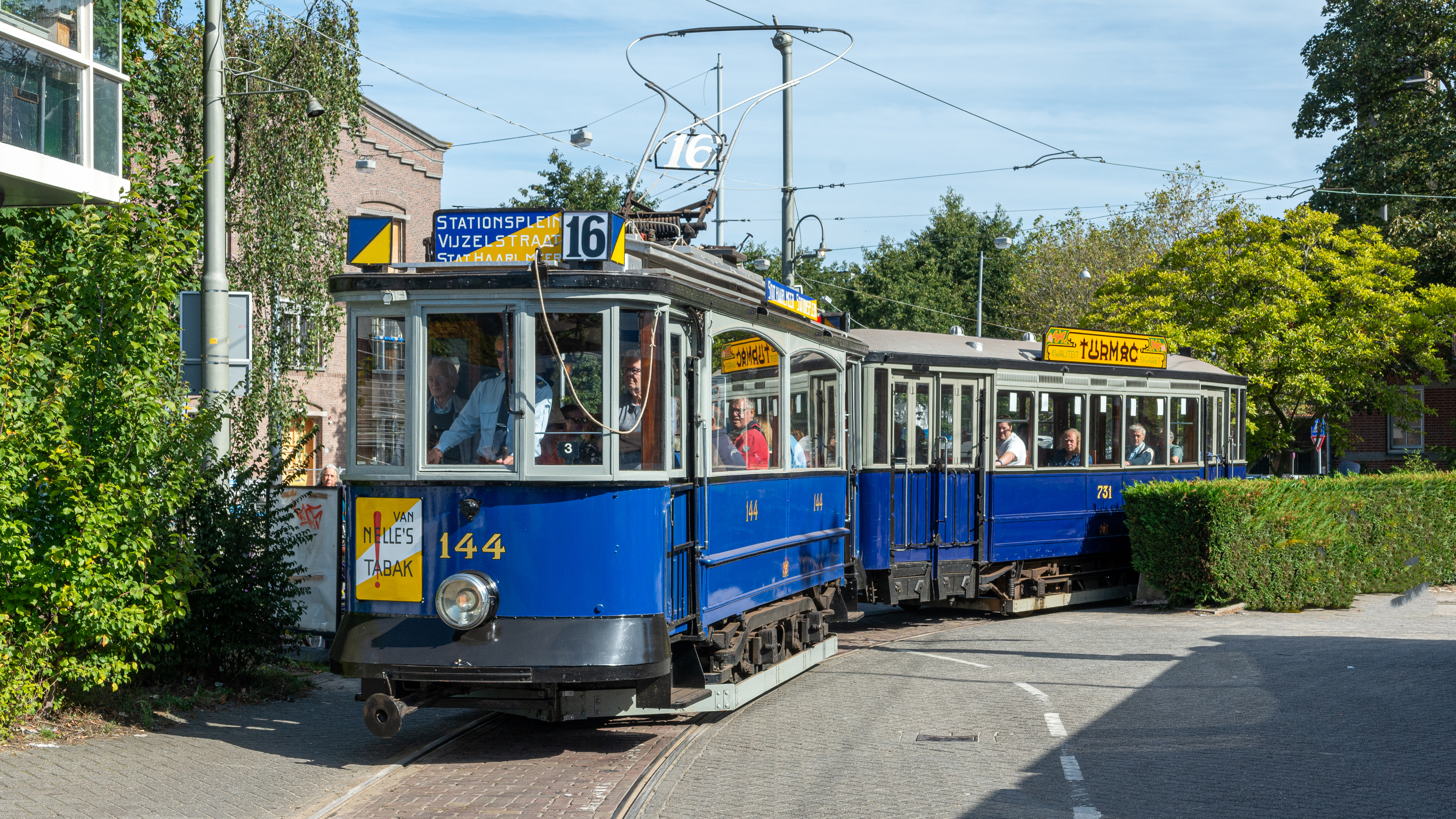
The Amsterdam motor car 144 with car 731 at the Haarlemmermeer station.

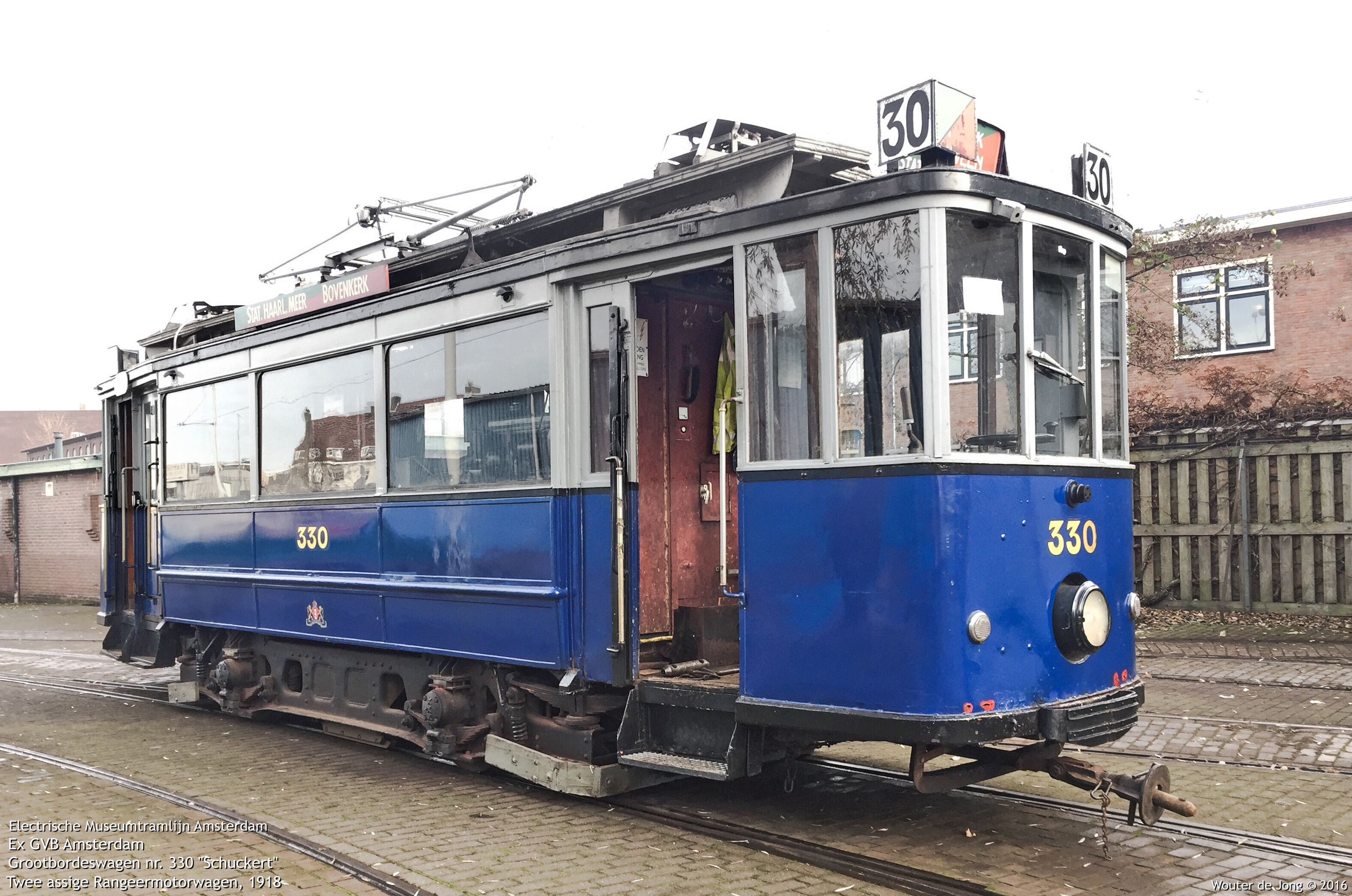
The Amsterdam motor car 330, diesel-electric car from 1918.

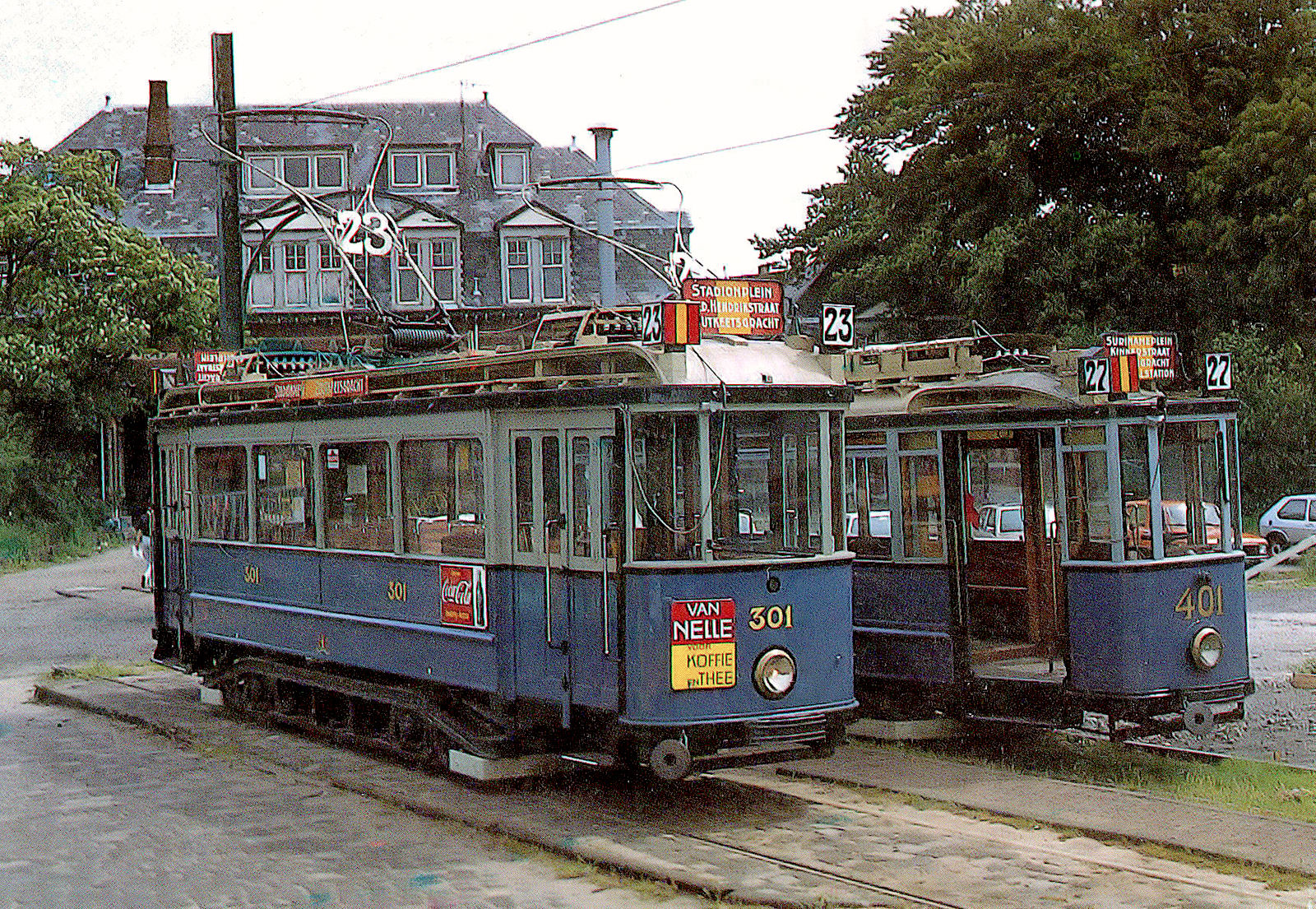
The Amsterdam motor cars 301 and 401 at the Haarlemmermeer station

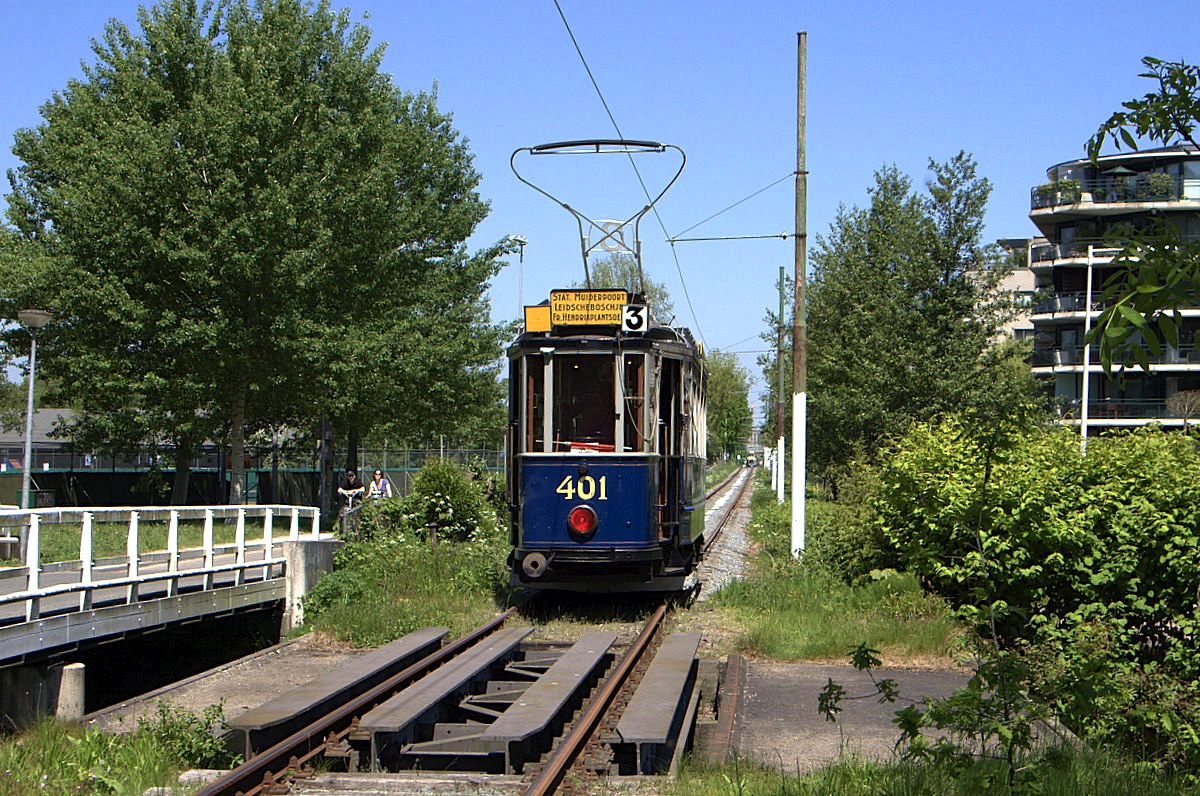
The Amsterdam motor car 401 at the Koenenkade, near the Amsterdamse Bos.

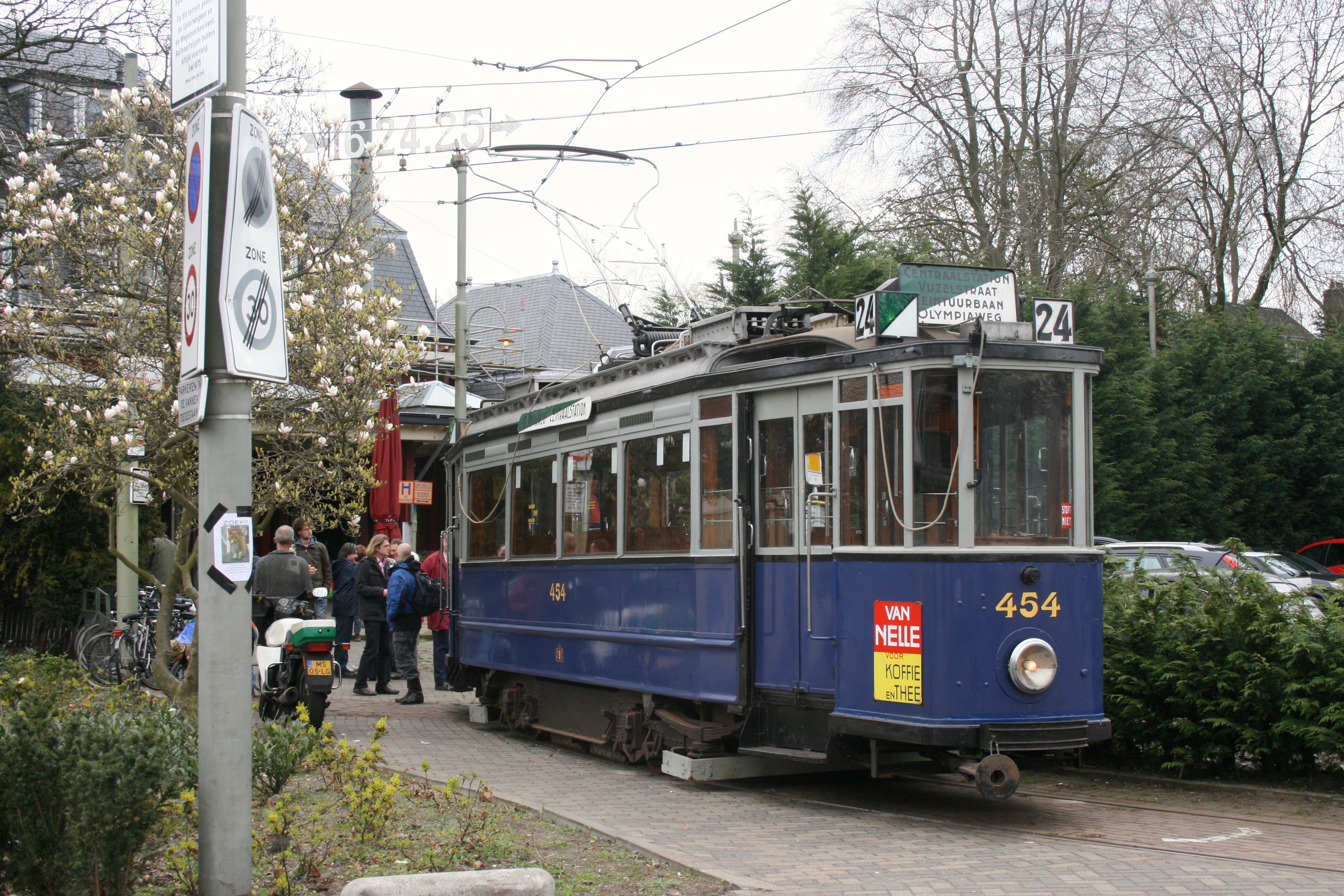
The Amsterdam motor car GVB 454 at the Haarlemmermeer station.

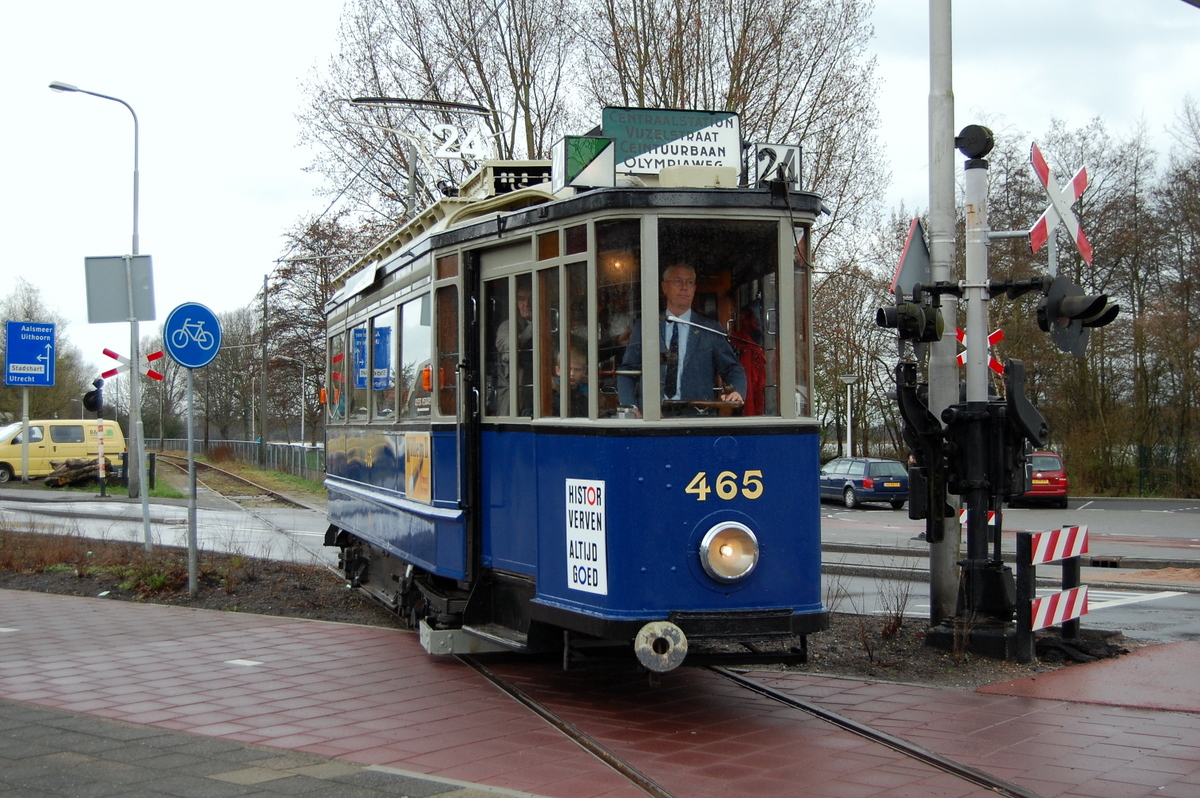
De Amsterdamse motorwagen 465 op de overweg van de Handweg te Amstelveen.

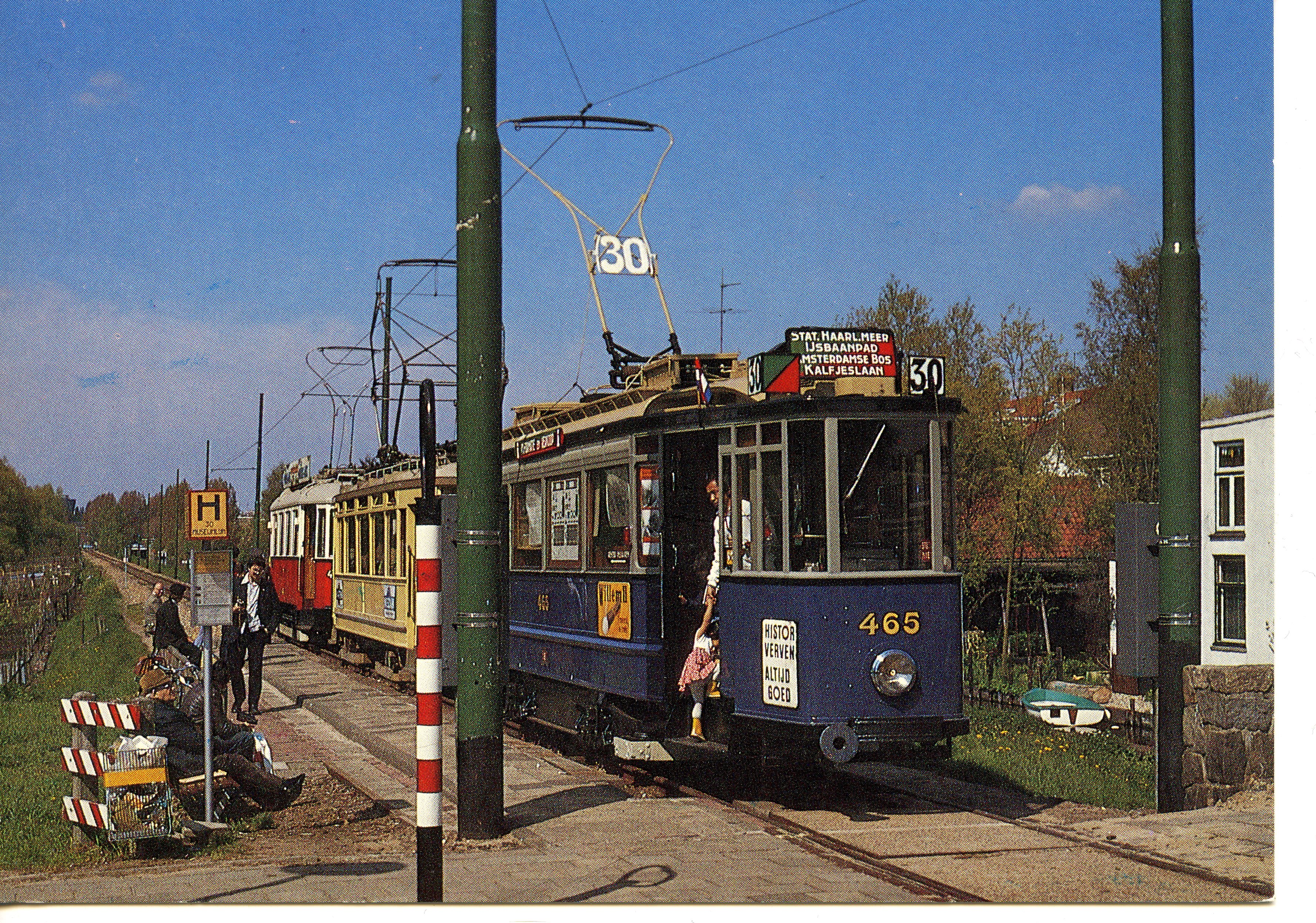
GVB 465, HTM 816 and WVB 4143 on the Museum tram line at the Kalfjeslaan; 9 May 1982.

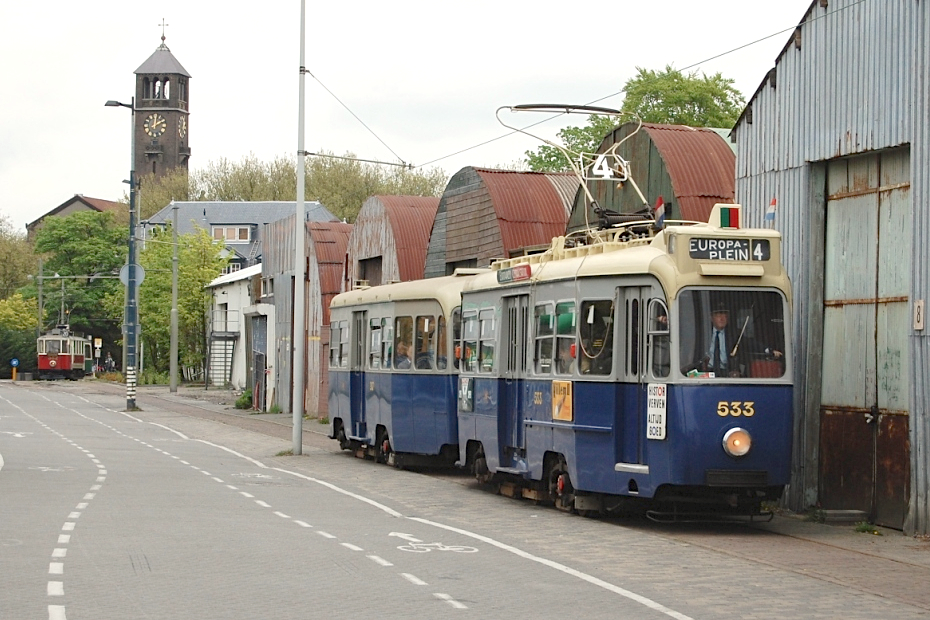
Amsterdam three-axle ramtle 533+987 at the Haarlemmermeer station.

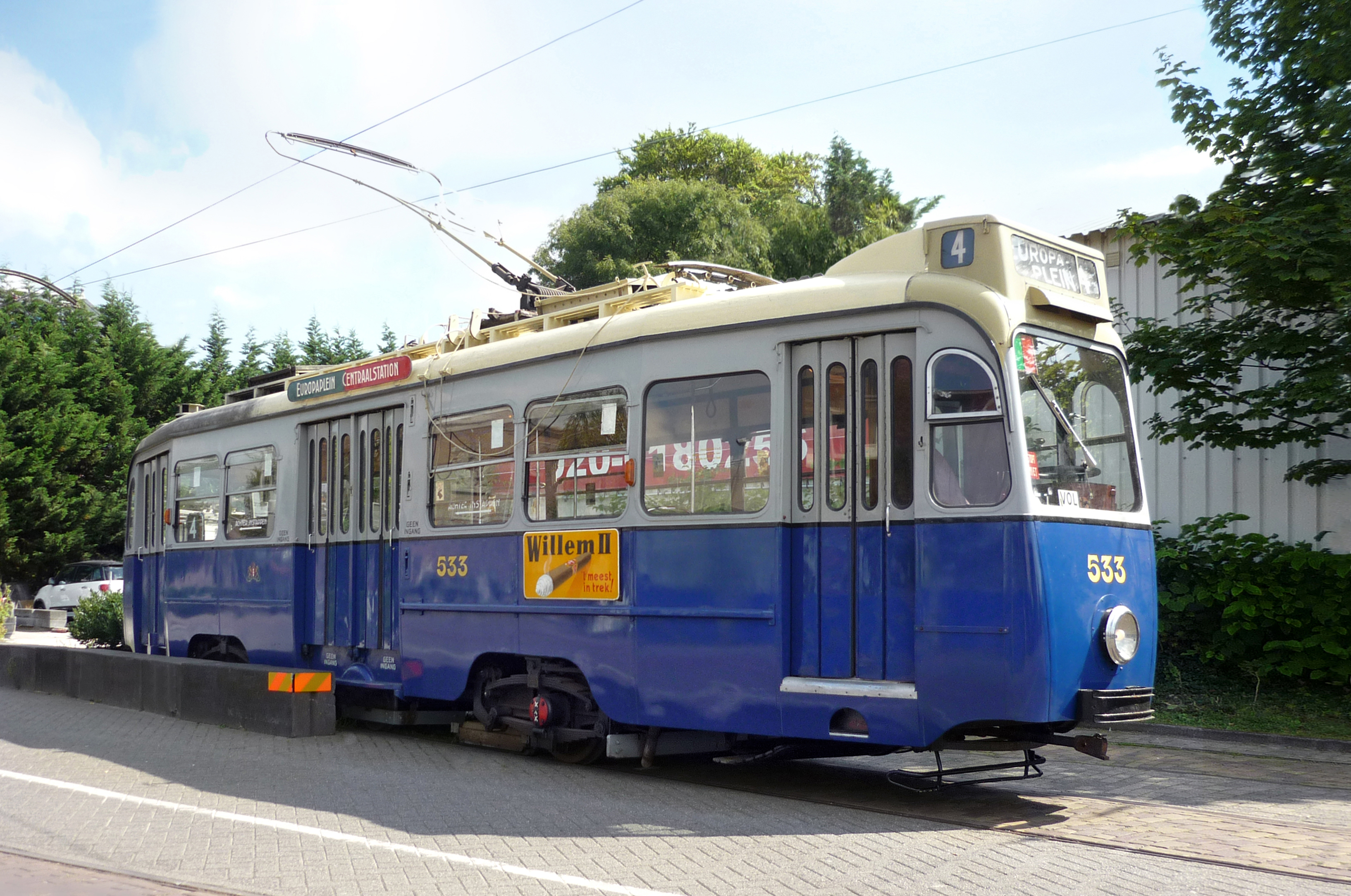
Amsterdam three-axle motor car 533 from 1950.

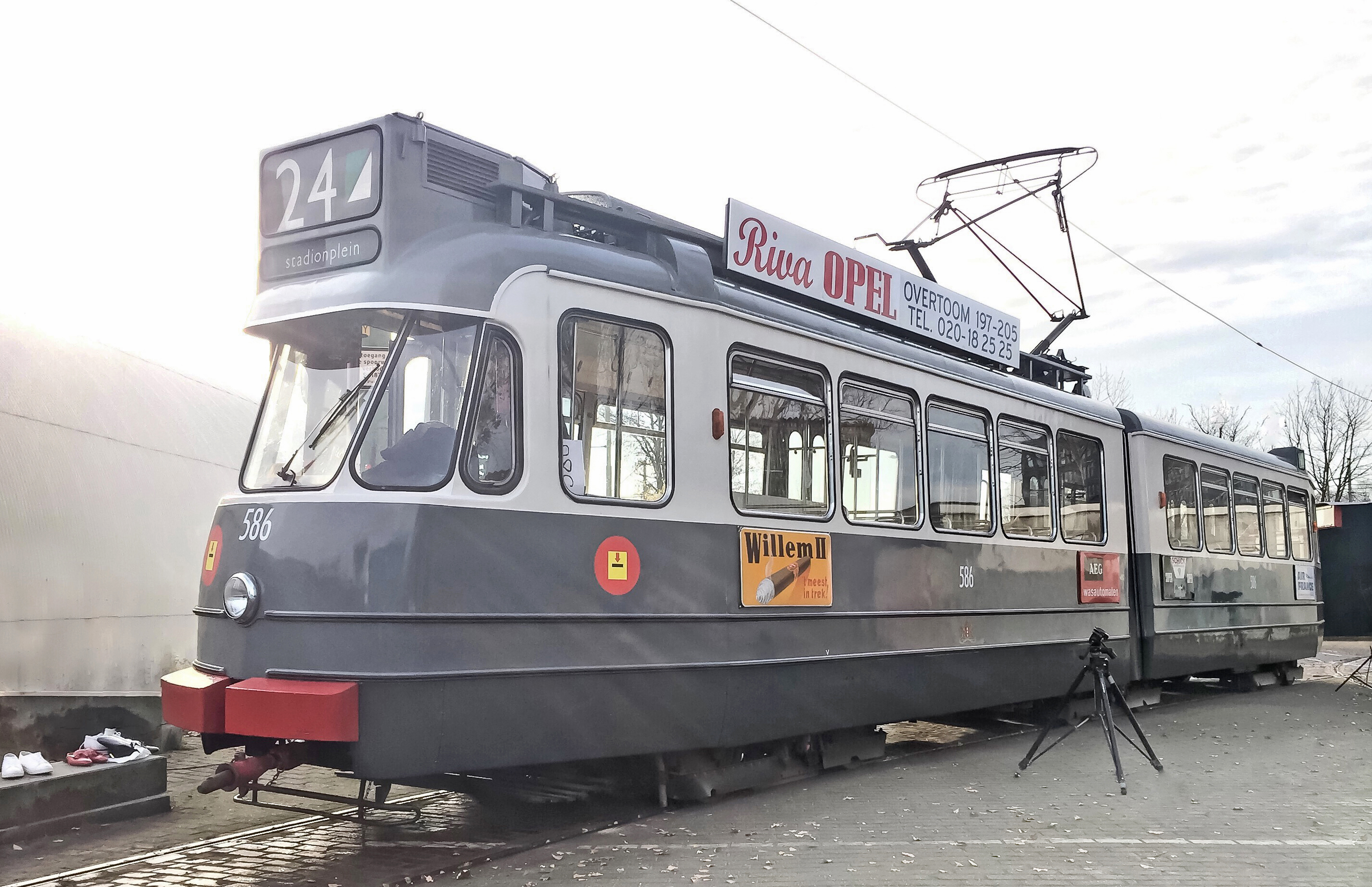
Amsterdam single-articulated tram 586, Type 2G from 1957.

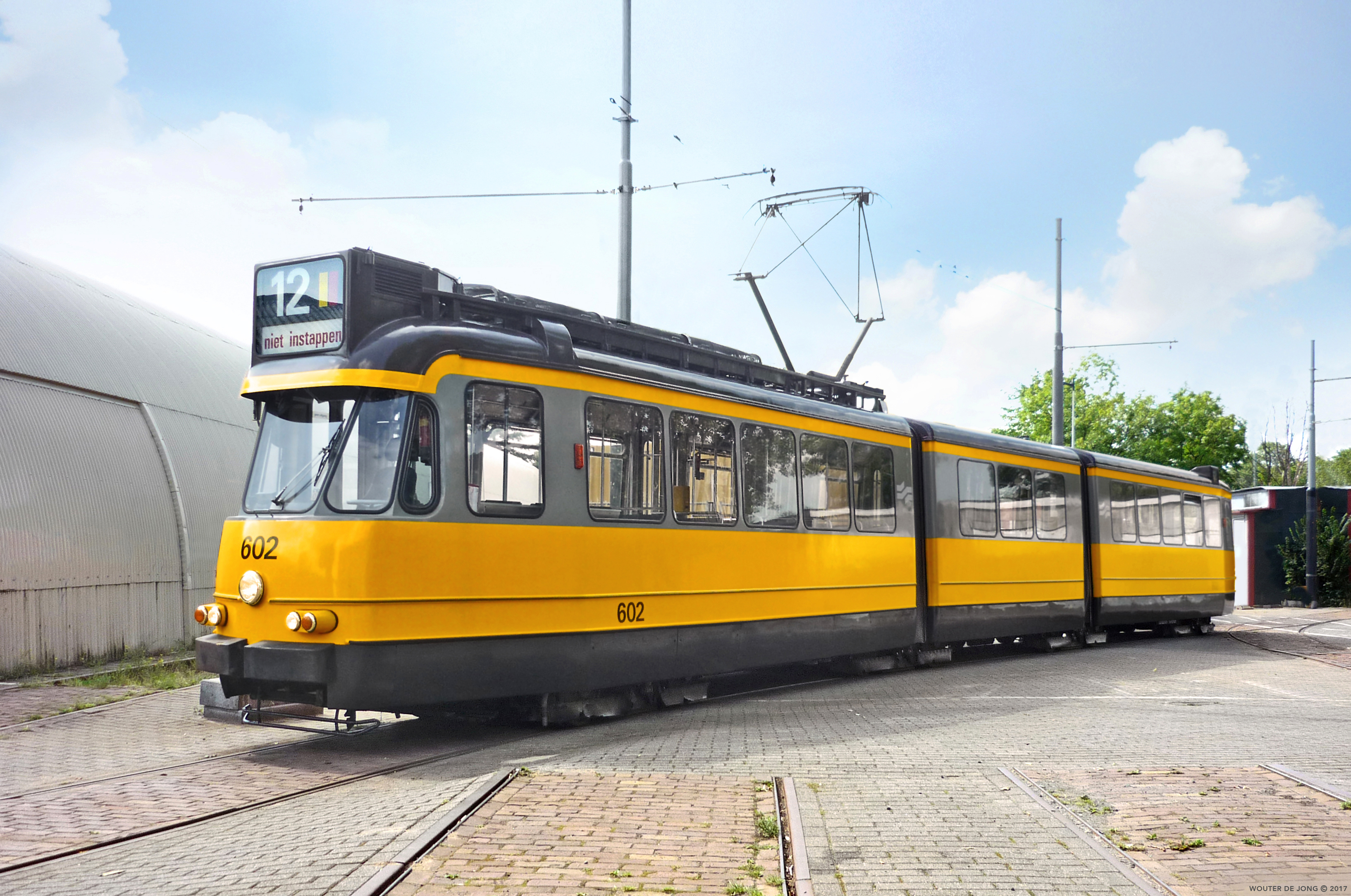
Amsterdam double-articulated tram 602, Type 3G from 1959.

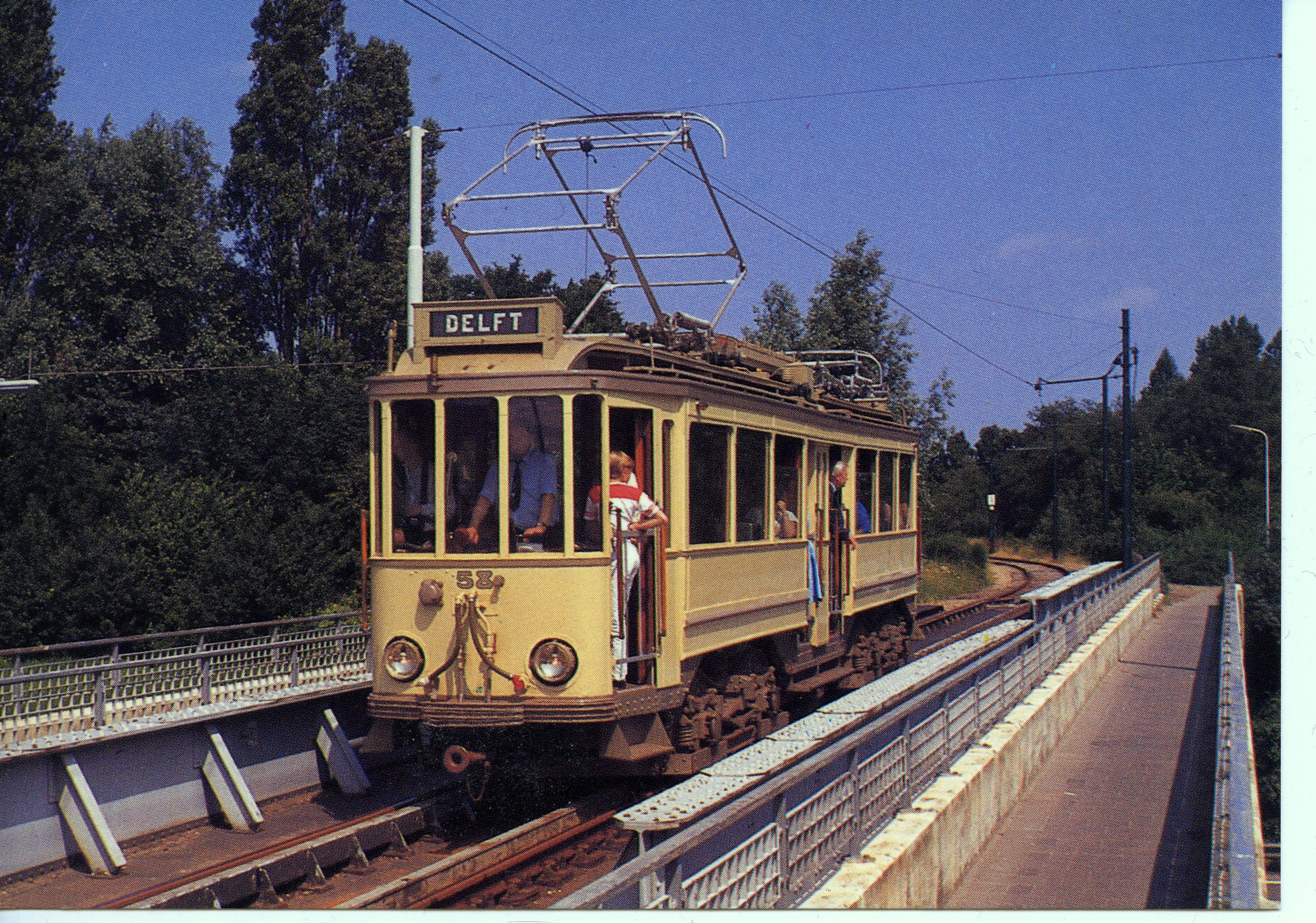
HTM 58 on the Museumtram line on the viaduct in Amstelveen; 29 July 1984.

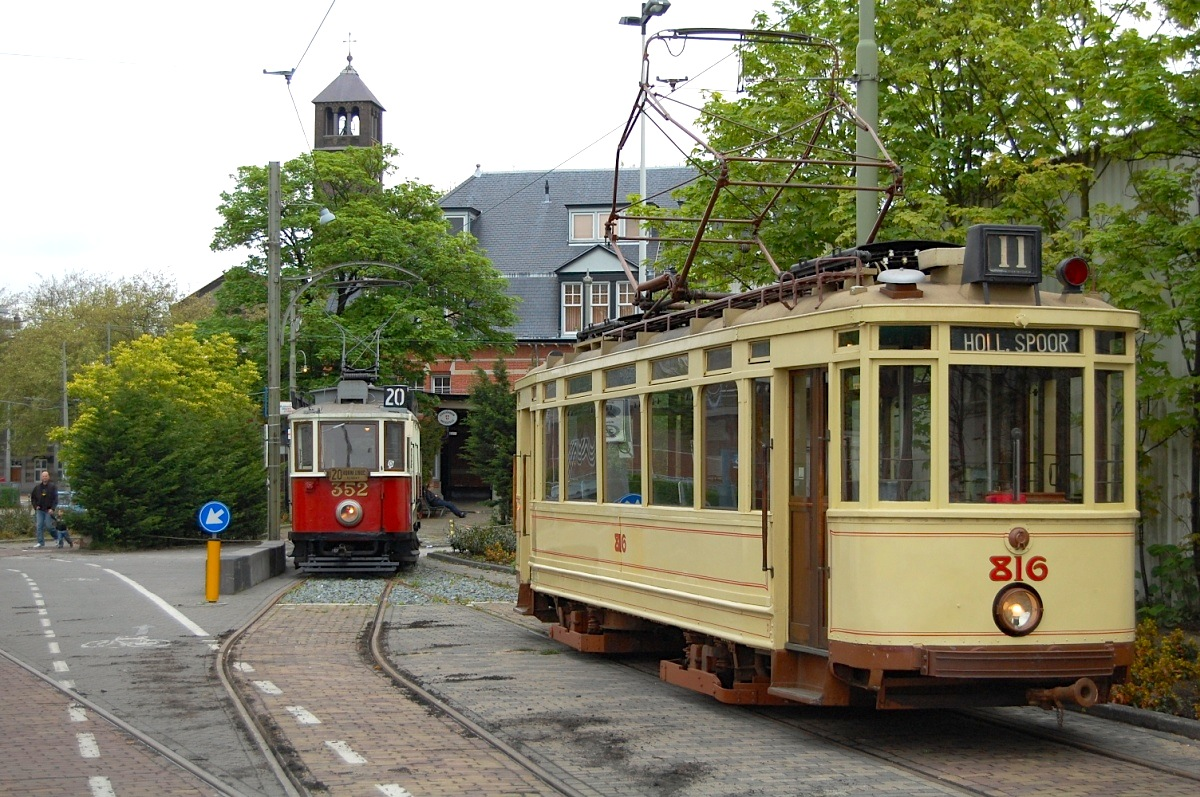
Prague motor car 352 and The Hague motor car 816 at the Haarlemmermeer station.

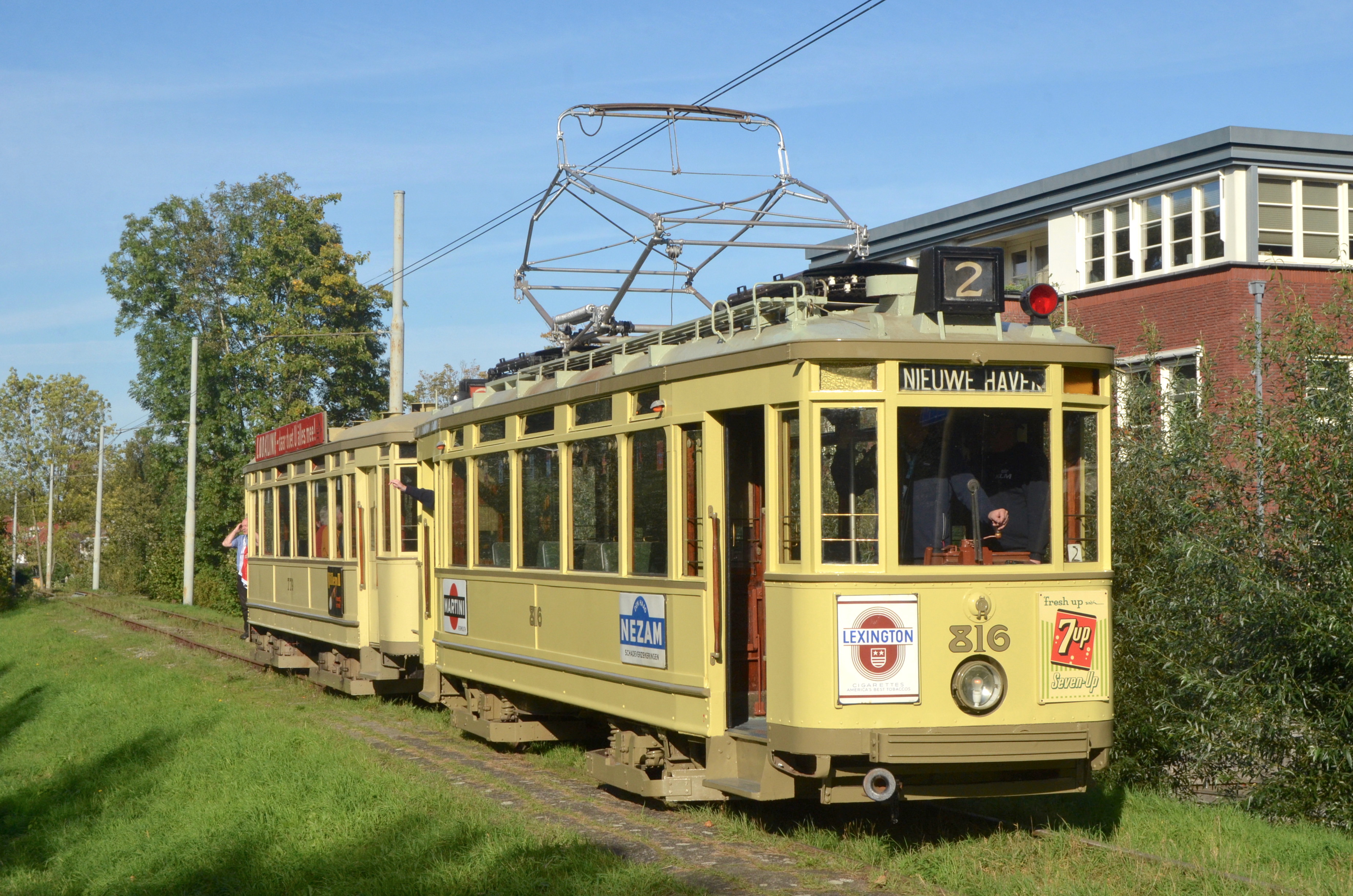
HTM 816 + 779 bij de Amsterdamseweg te Amstelveen.

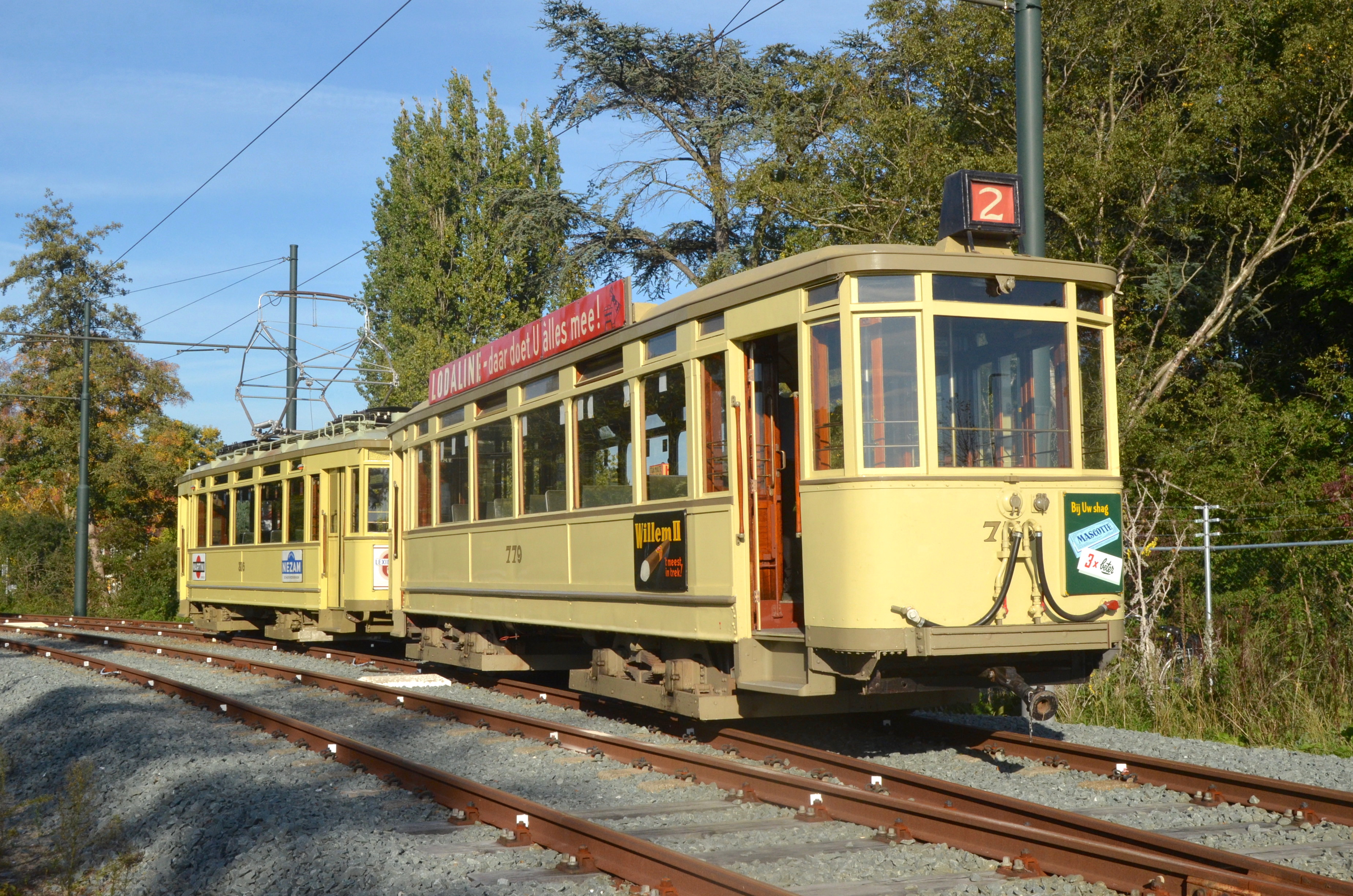
HTM 779 + 816 at the Parklaan (change place) in Amstelveen.

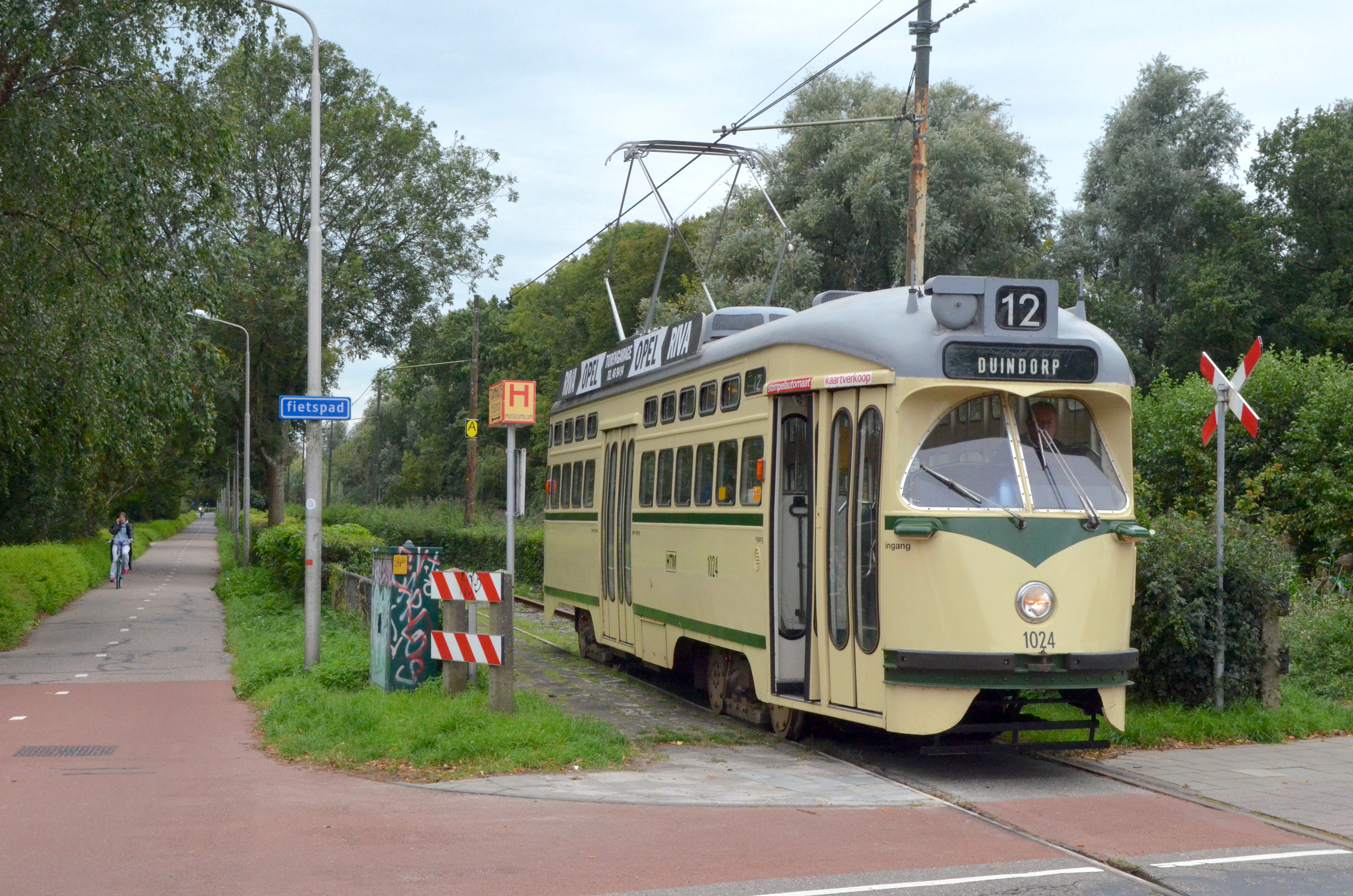
Hague PCC streetcar 1024 at the Molenweg in Amstelveen.

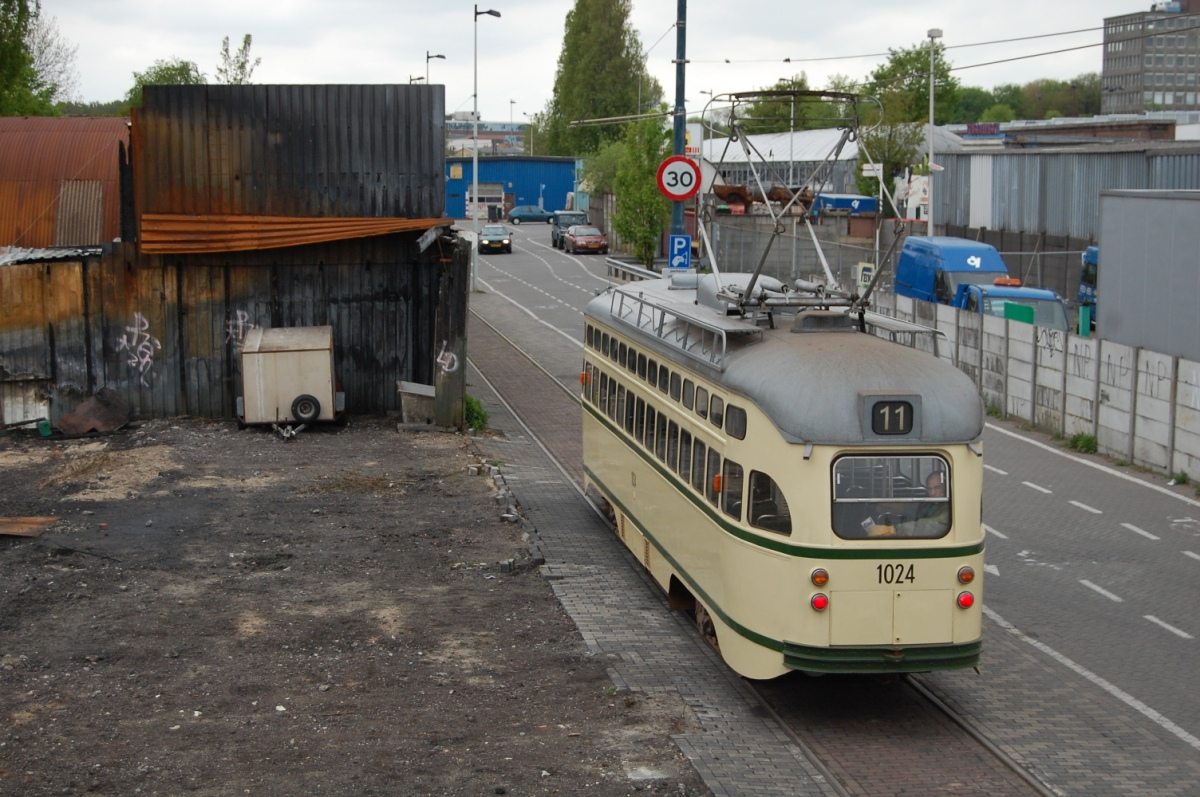
PCC-car 1024 at the Haarlemmermeer station.

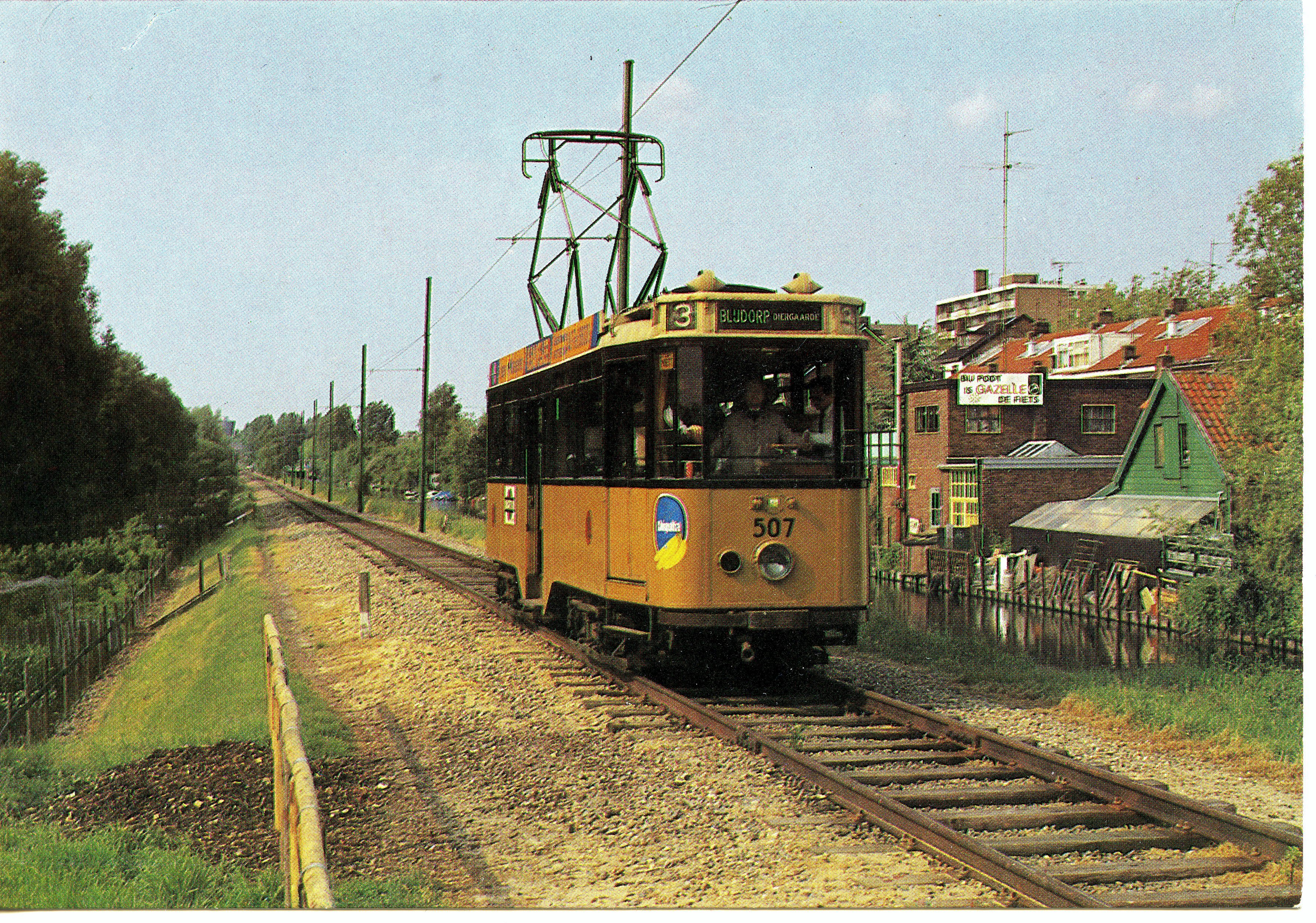
Rotterdam motor car 507 on the Museumtram line at the Kalfjeslaan; 27 May 1981.

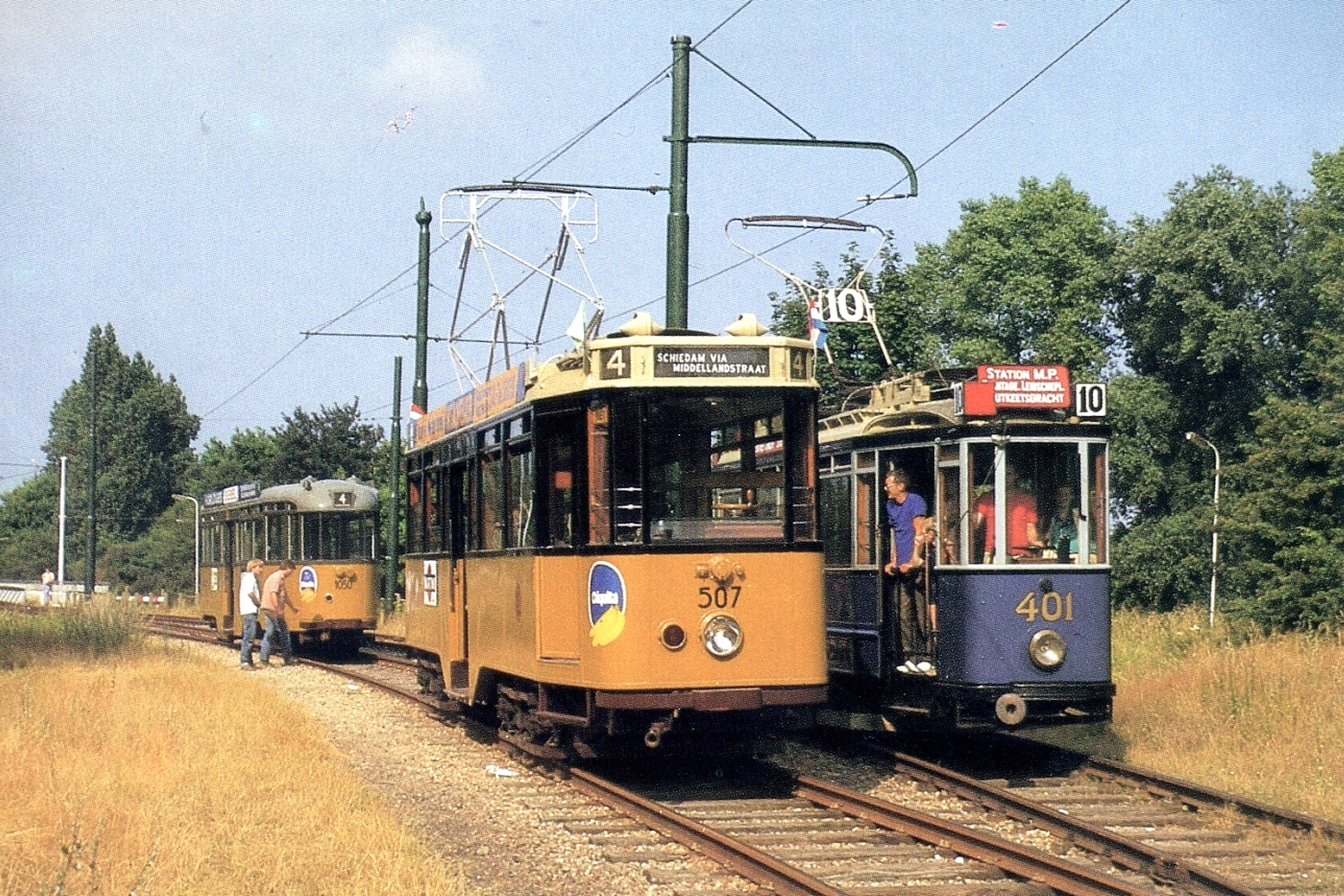
RET 507, 1050 and GVB 401 on the Museumtram line at the Amstelveen alternate place; 14 August 1984.

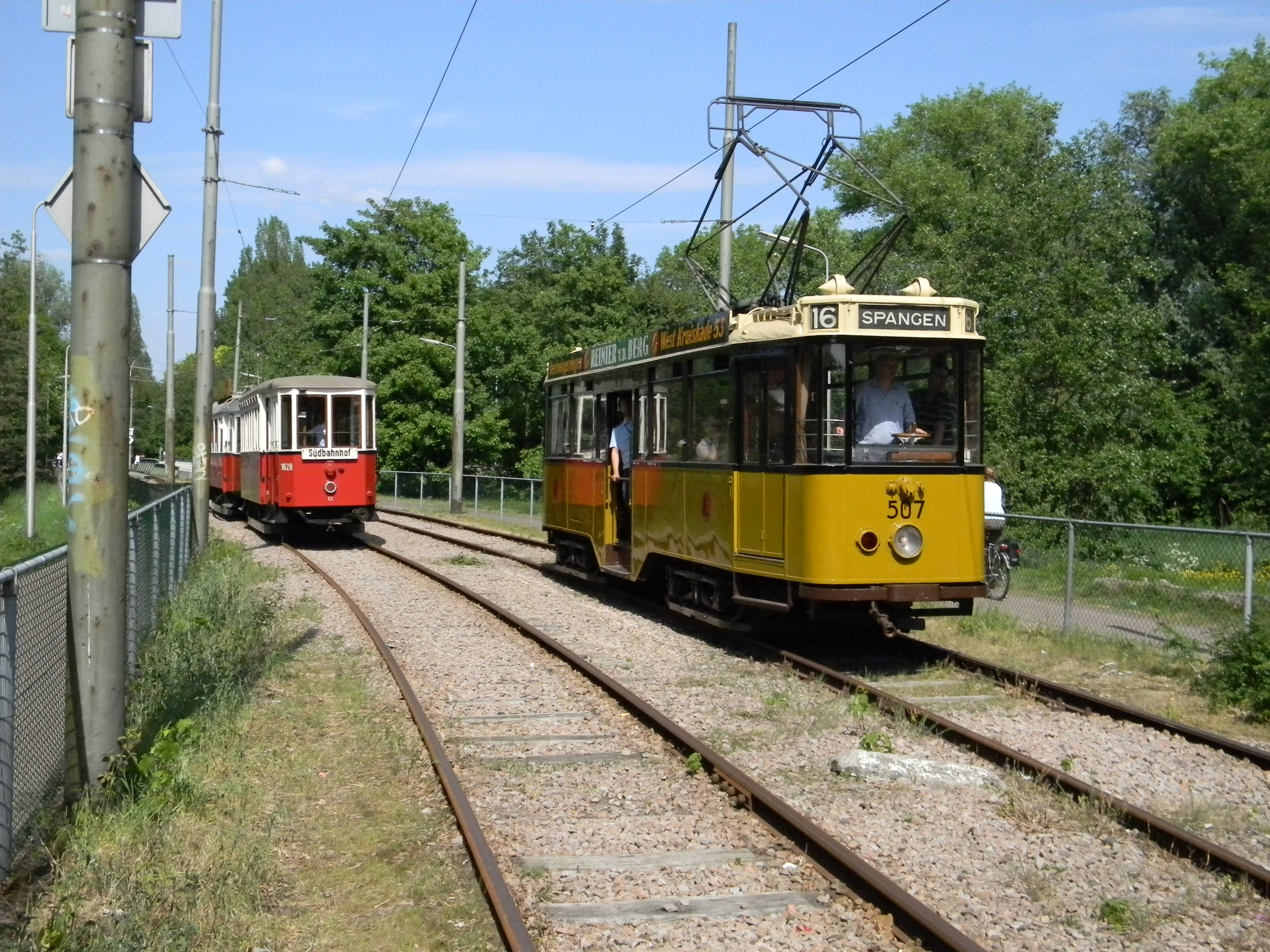
Rotterdam motor car 507 passes a Vienna tram at the substitution at Amstelveen Station.

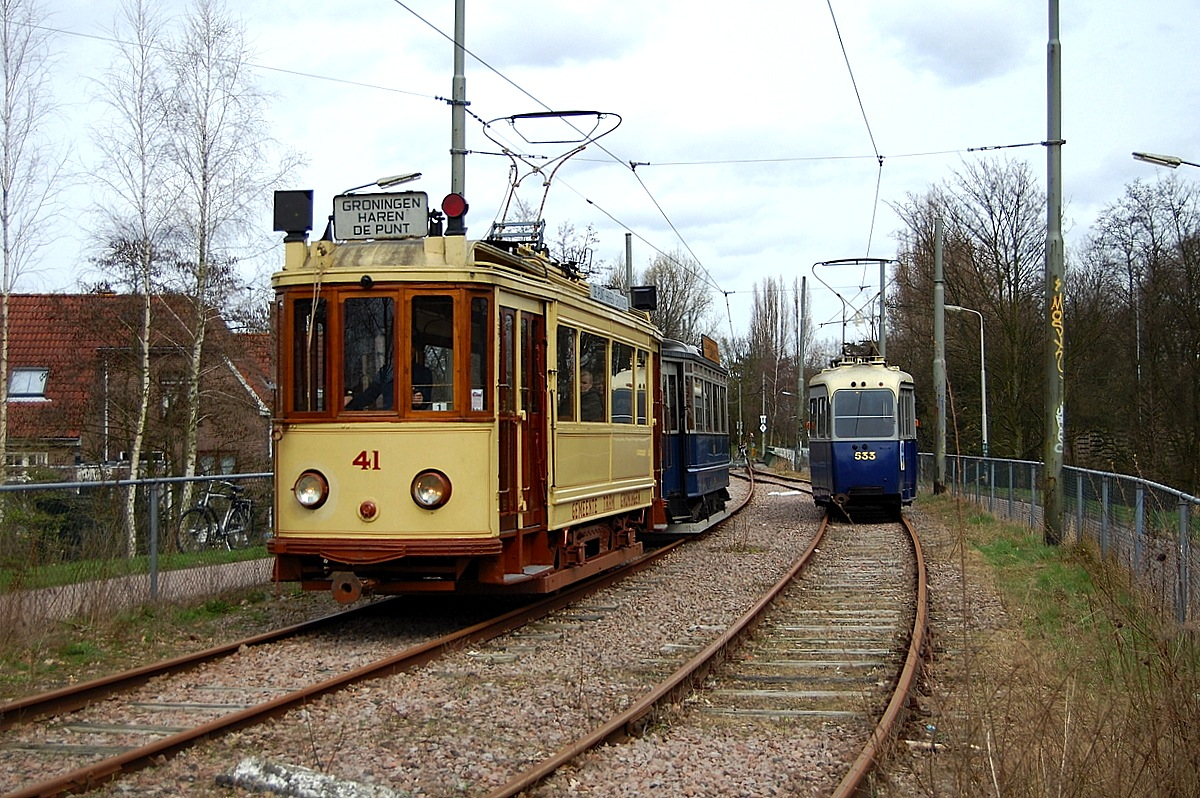
Groningen tram 41 with the Amsterdam car 916 in Amstelveen.

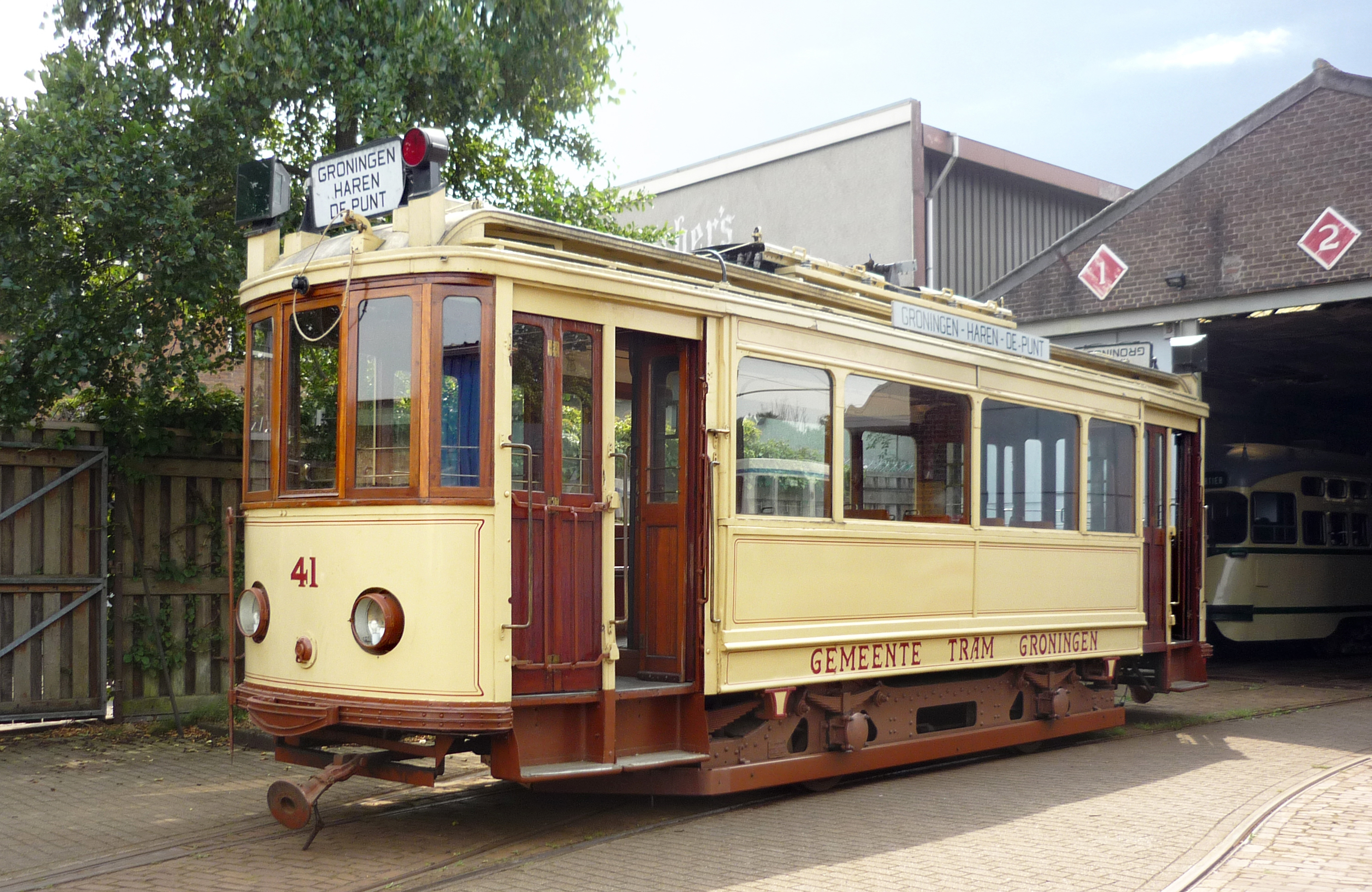
The Groningen motor car 41 (ex-HTM 267).

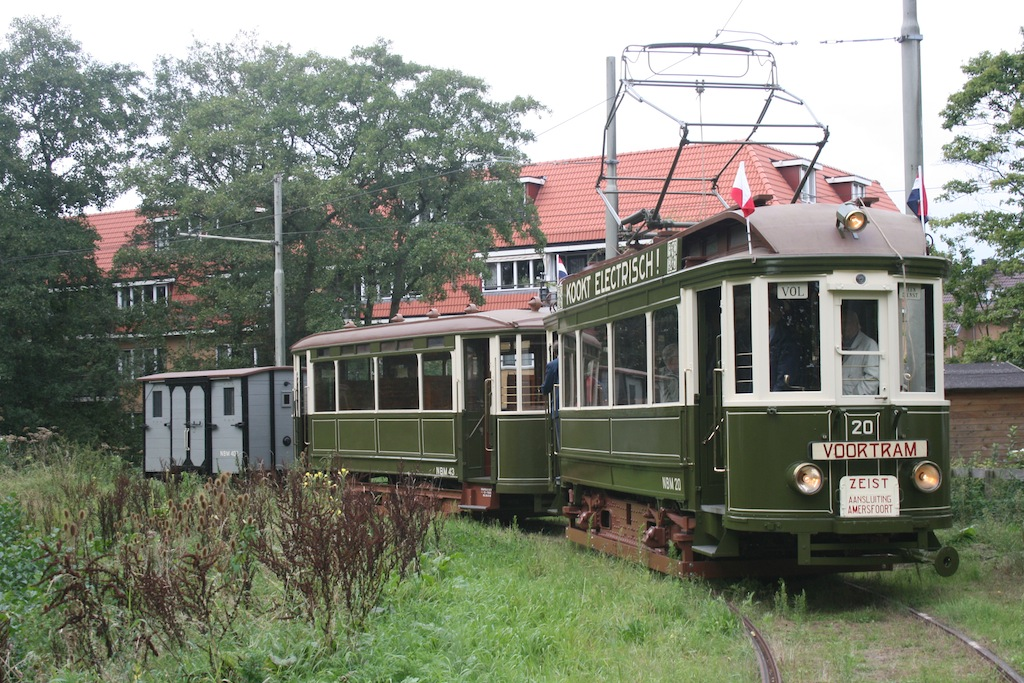
Trams NBM 20 + 43 + 402 in Bovenkerk.

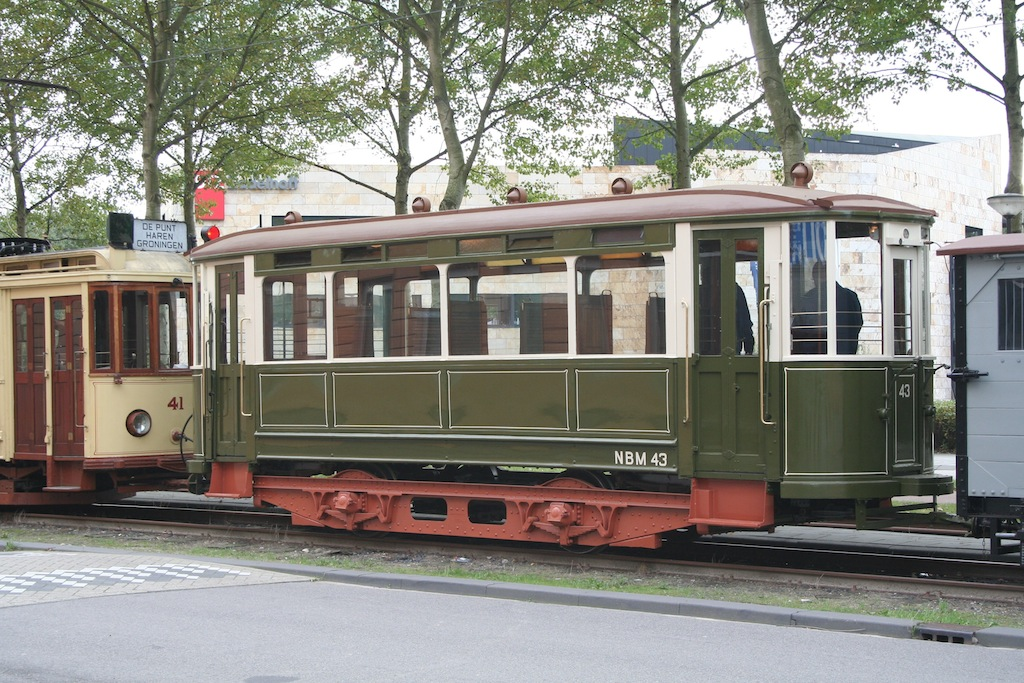
Trailer NBM 43, stop Jollenpad.

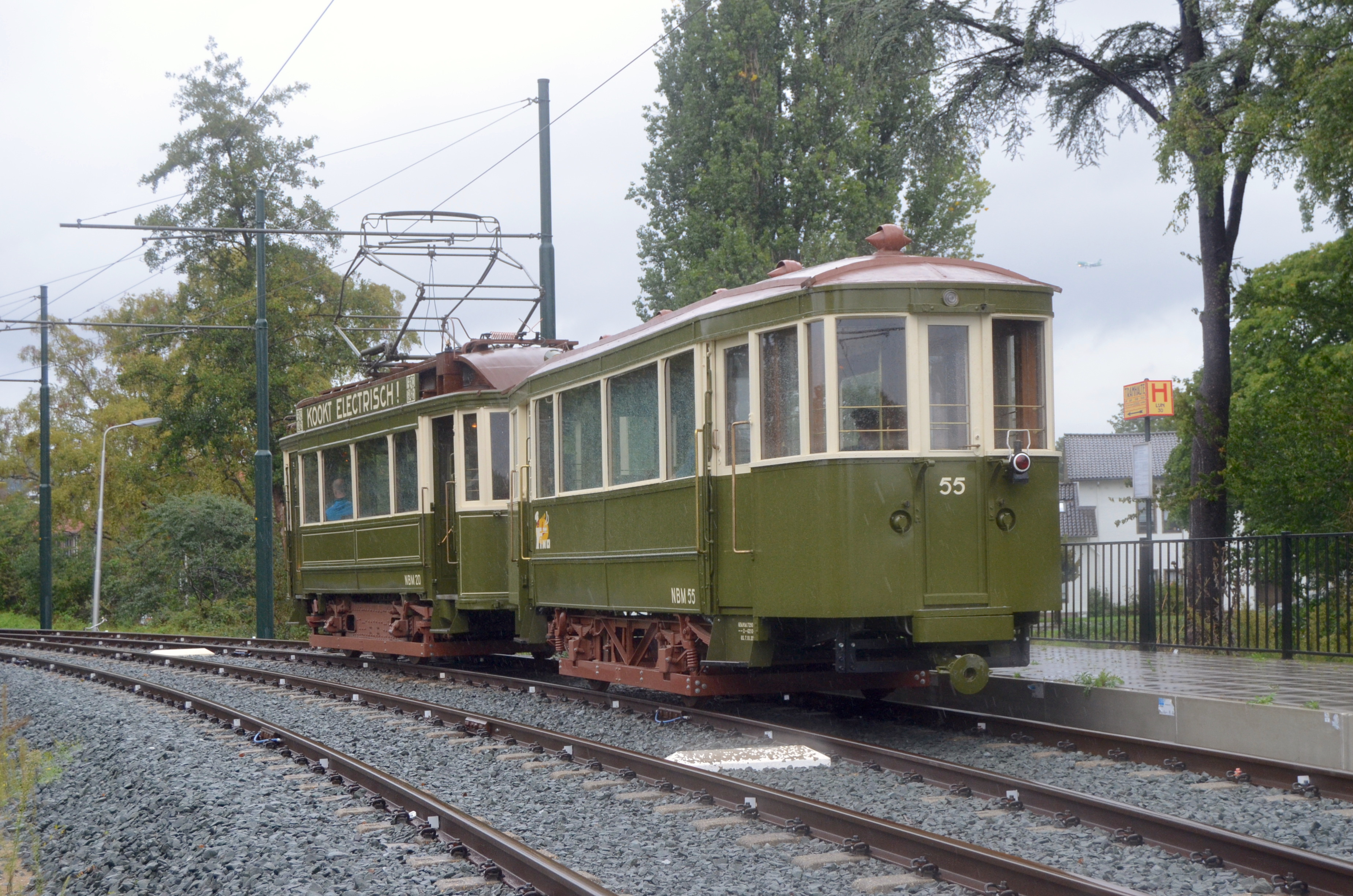
Trailer NBM 55 at the Parklaan (changeplace) in Amstelveen.

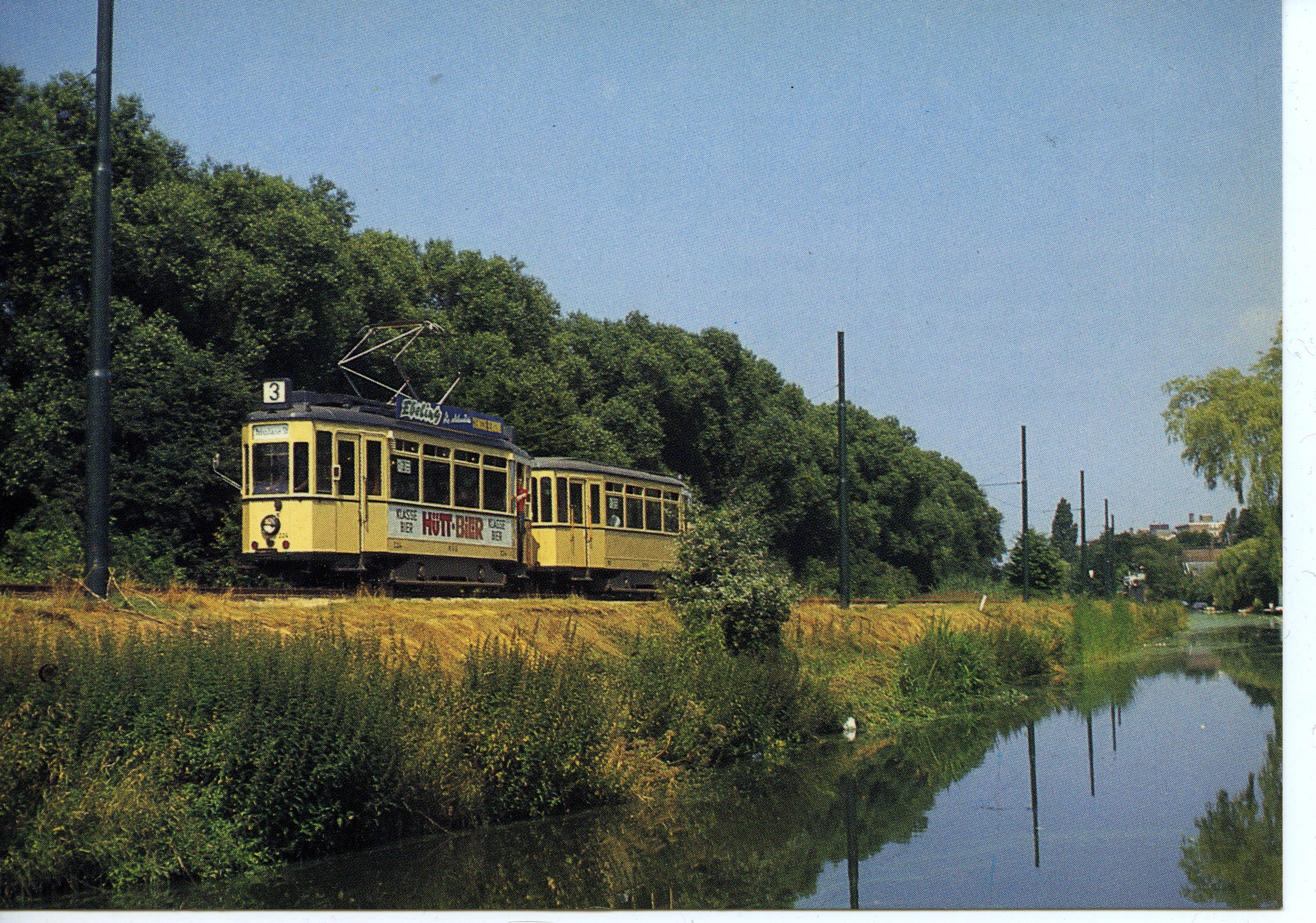
Kassel 224+511 on the Museum tram line at the Amsterdamseweg; 29 July 1984.

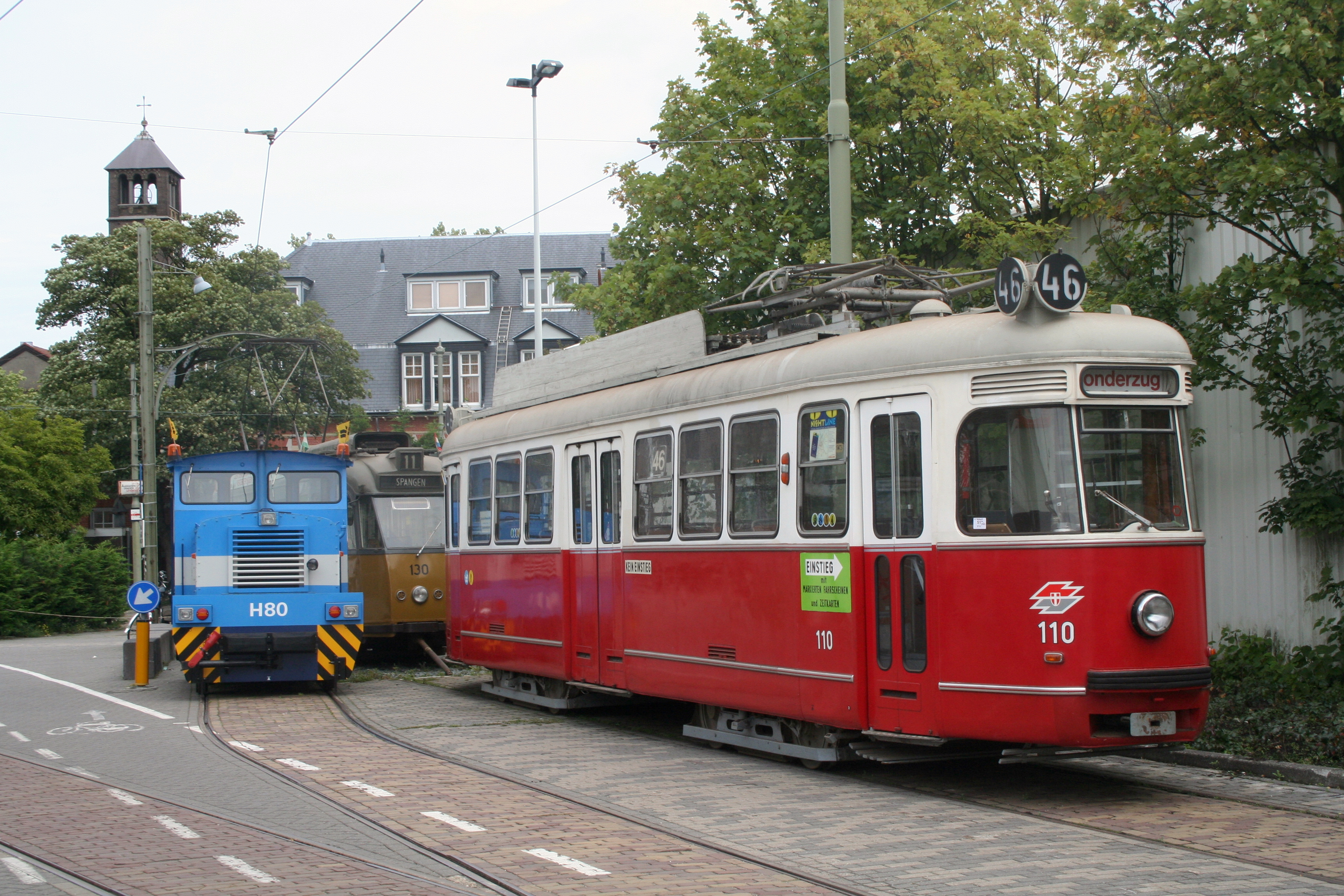
Viennese motorcar 110 at the Haarlemmermeer station (left GVB H80).

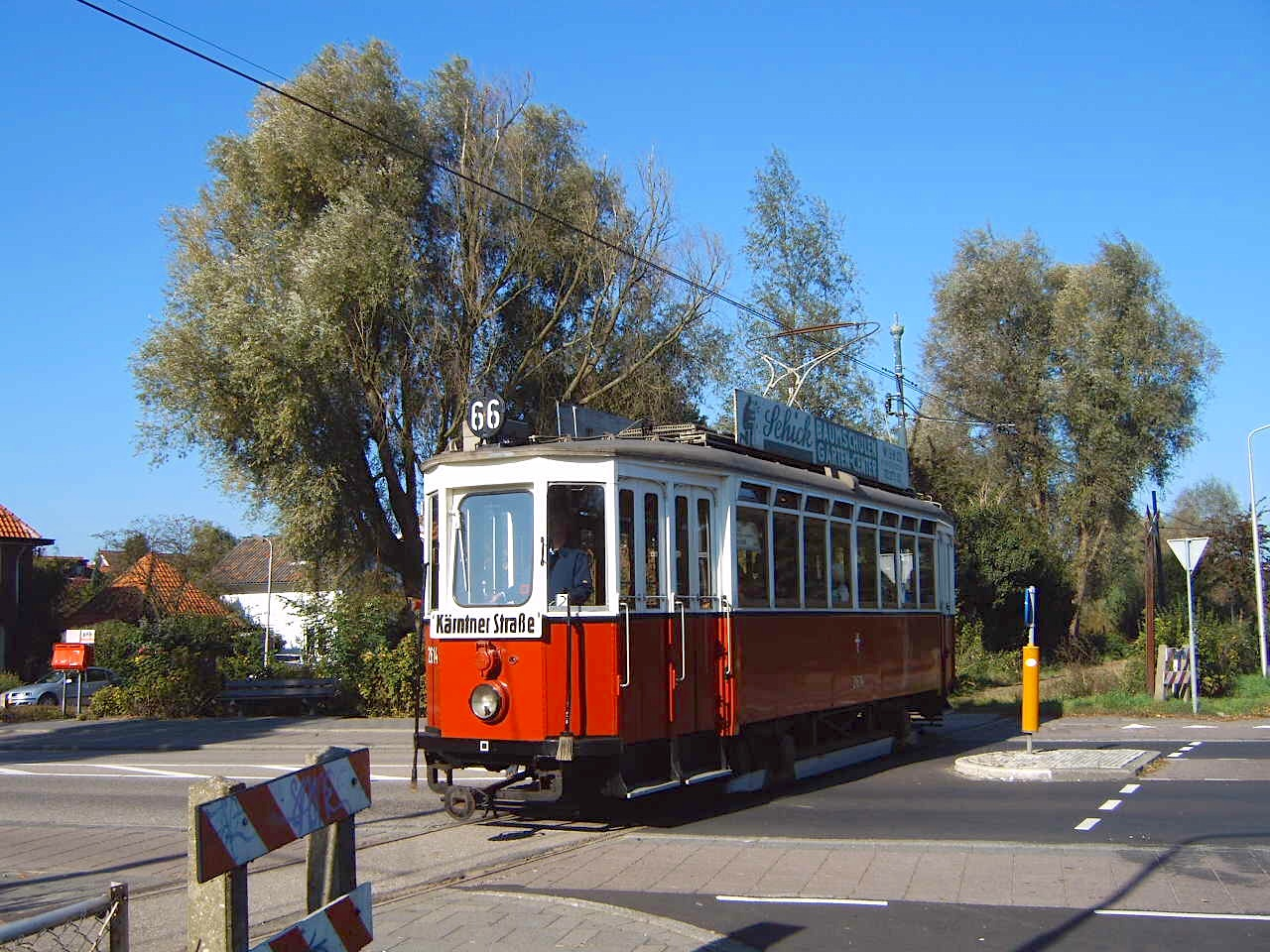
Viennese motor car 2614 in Amstelveen.

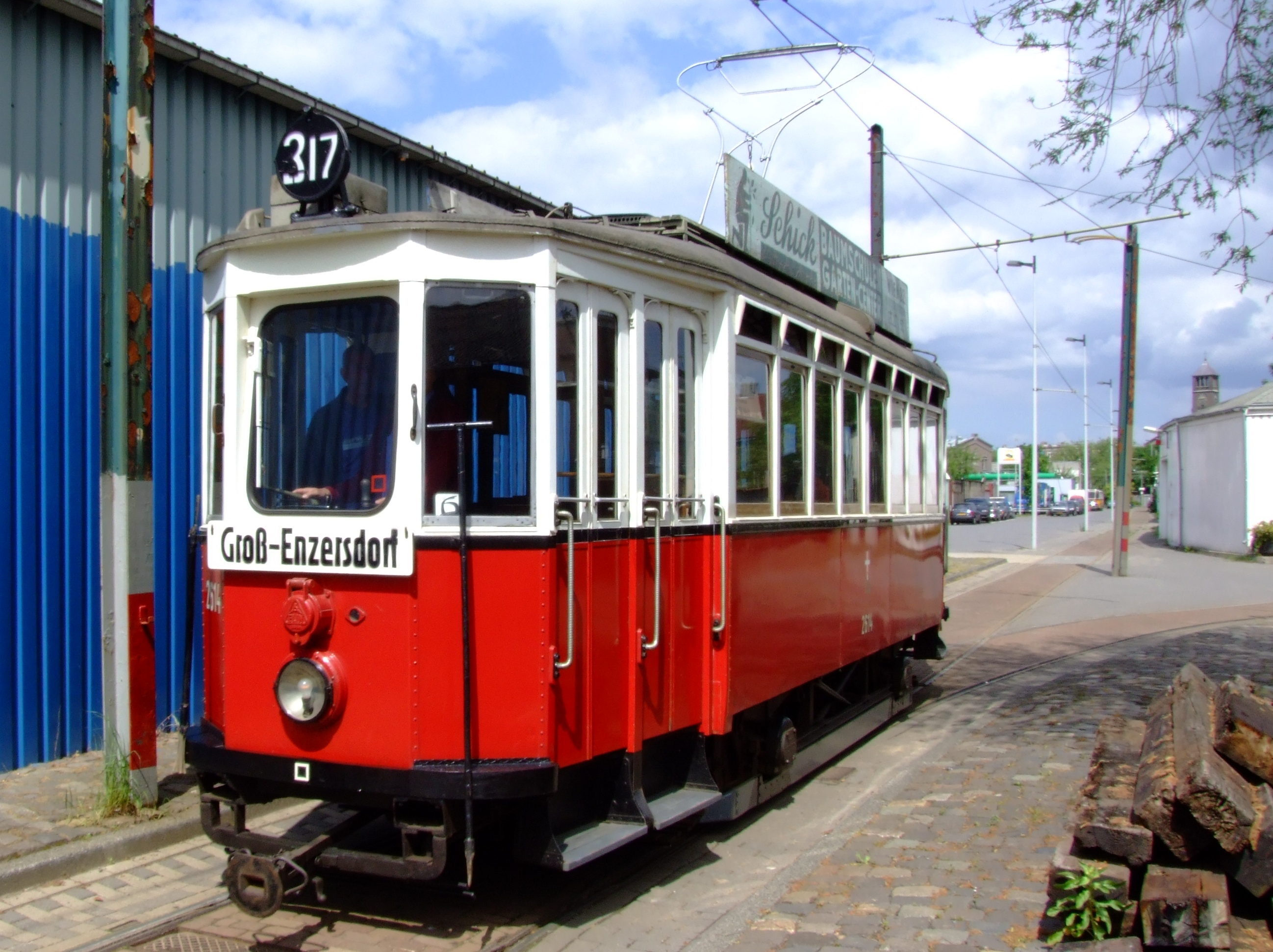
Viennese motor car 2614 at the Karperweg yard.

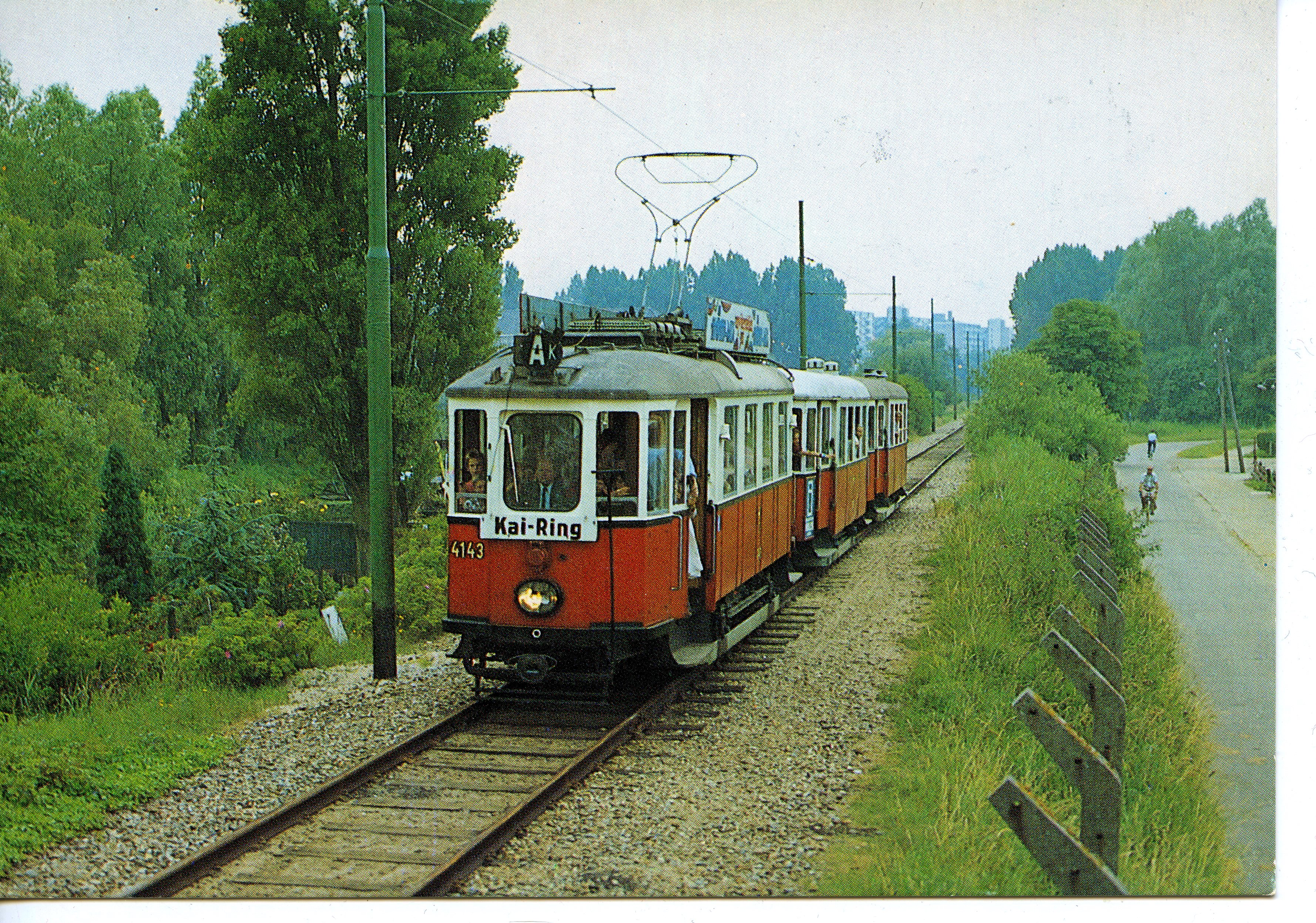
WVB 4143+5290+5312 on the Museum tram line at the Ice Fleet; 27 May 1981.

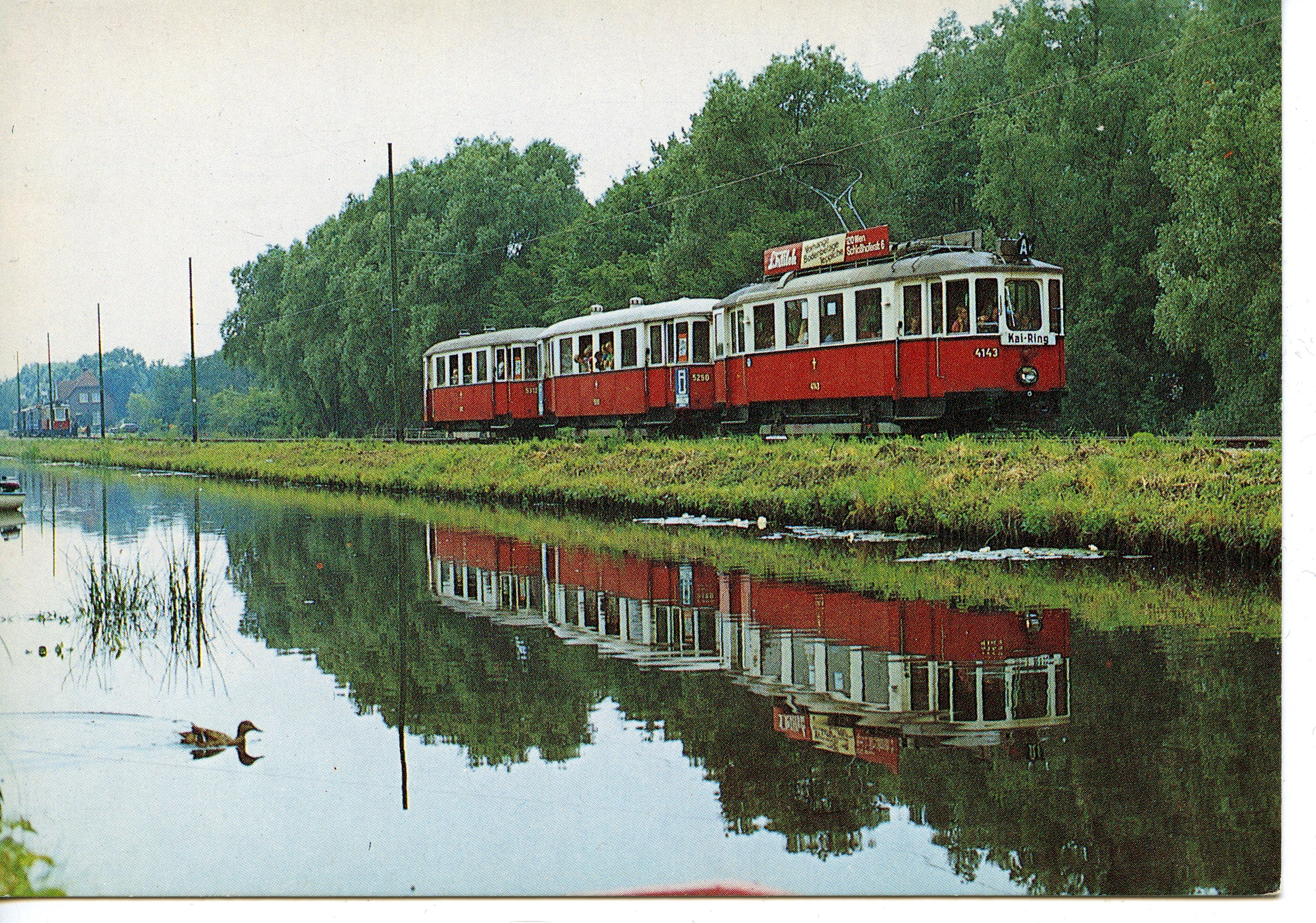
WVB 4143+5290+5312 on the Museum tram line at the Kalfjeslaan; 27 May 1981.

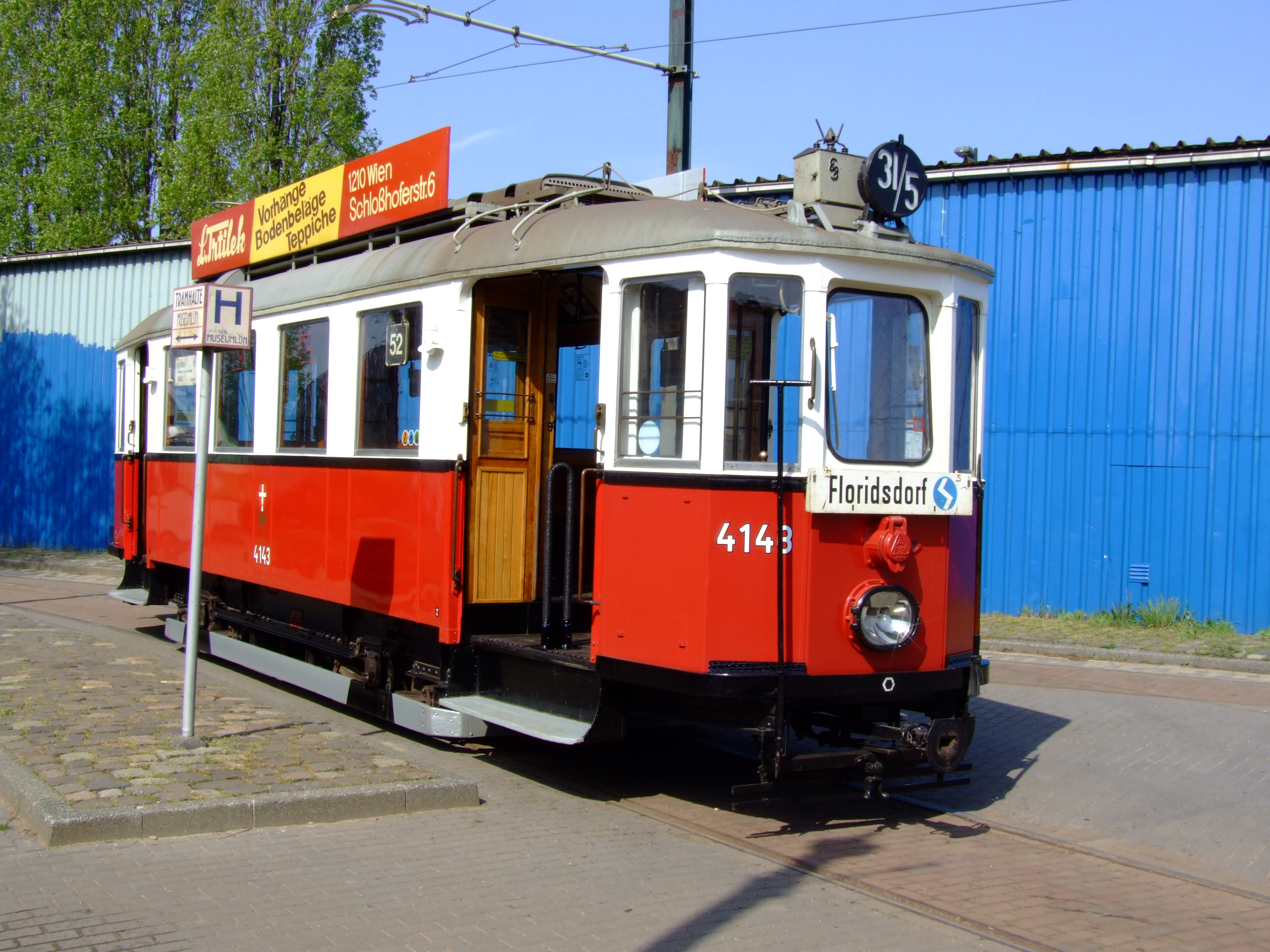
Viennese motor car 4143 at the Karperweg yard.

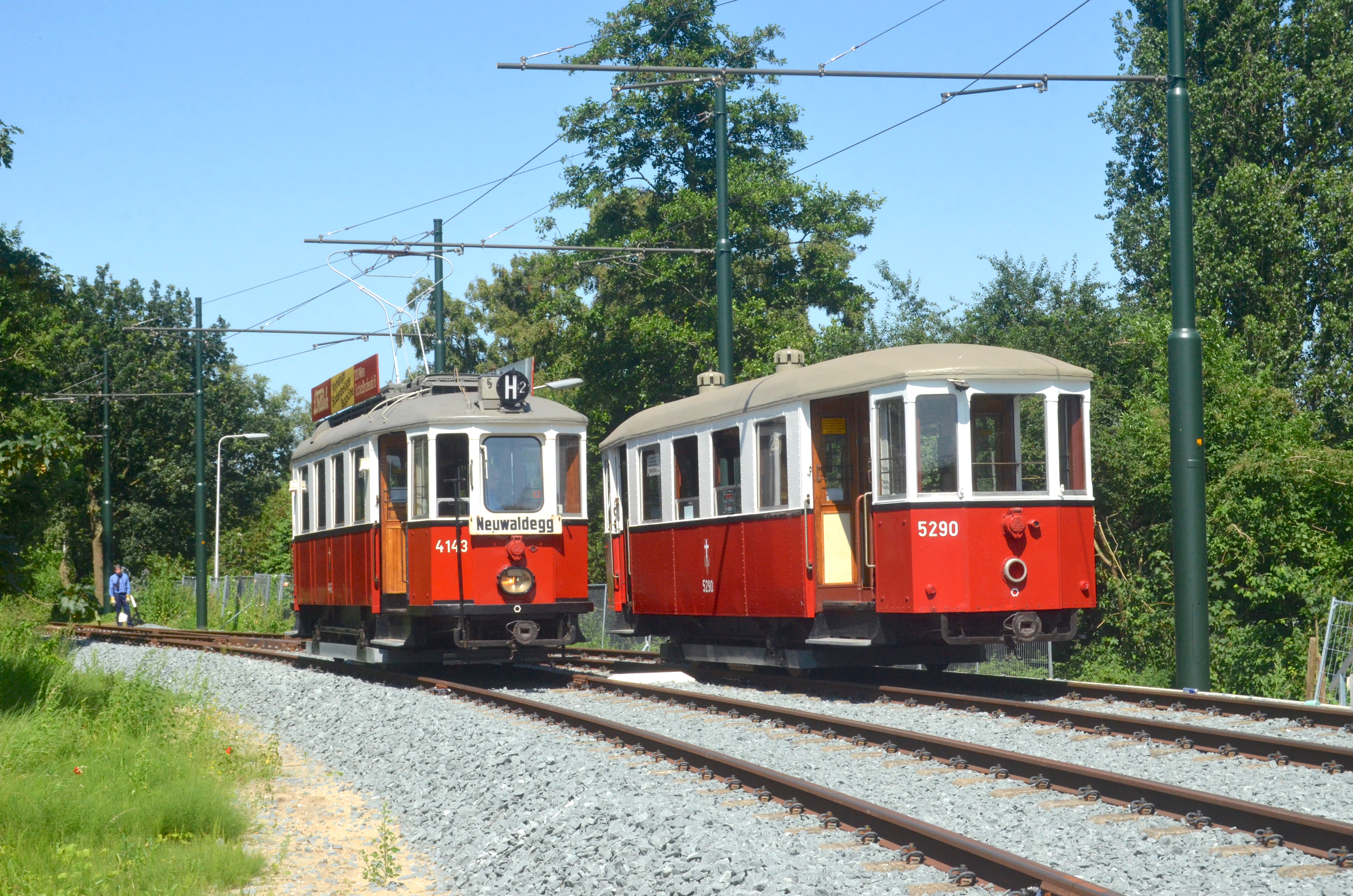
WVB 4143 and 5290 at the Parklaan (change place) in Amstelveen.

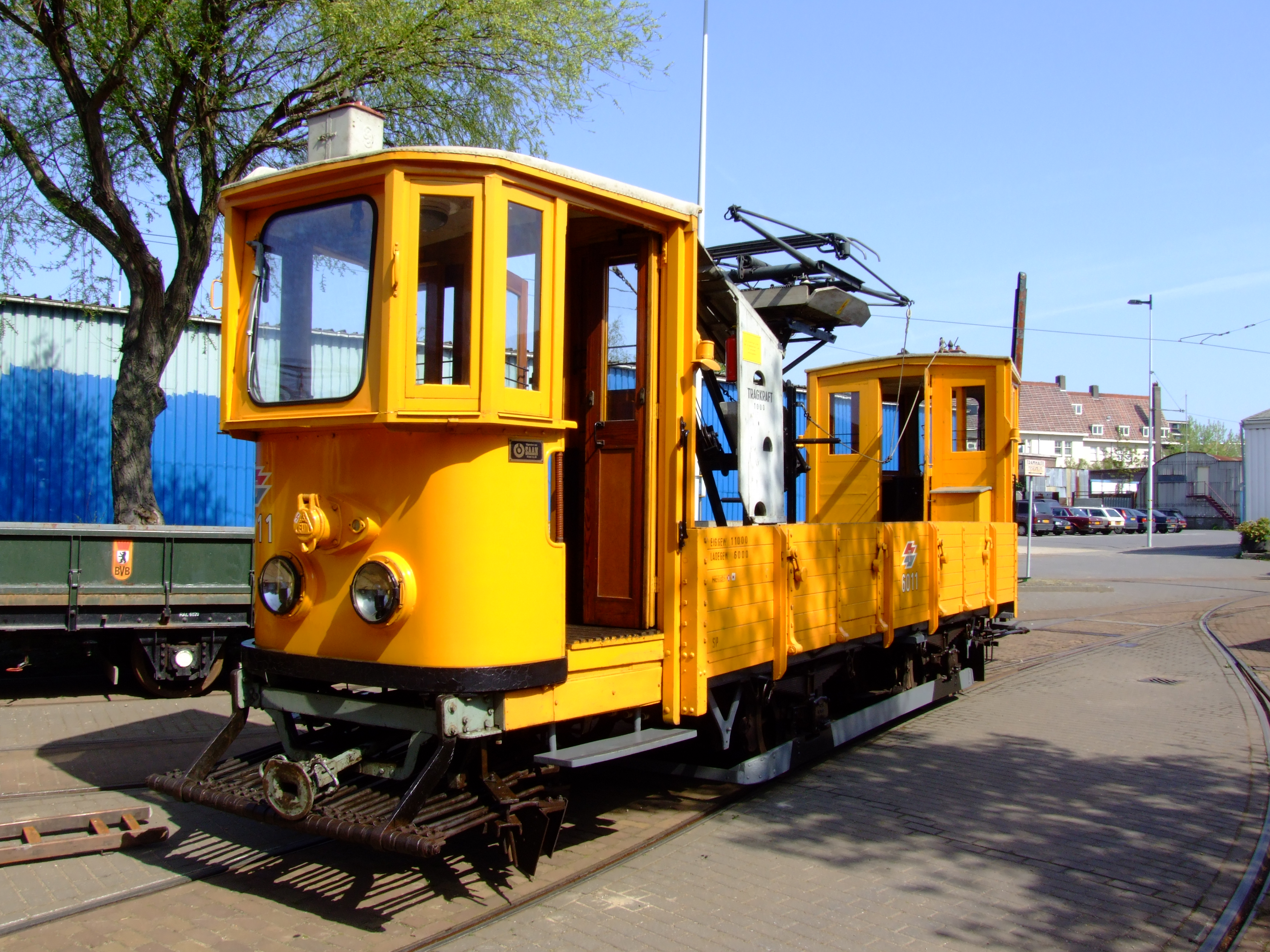
Viennese crane car 6011 at the Karperweg yard.

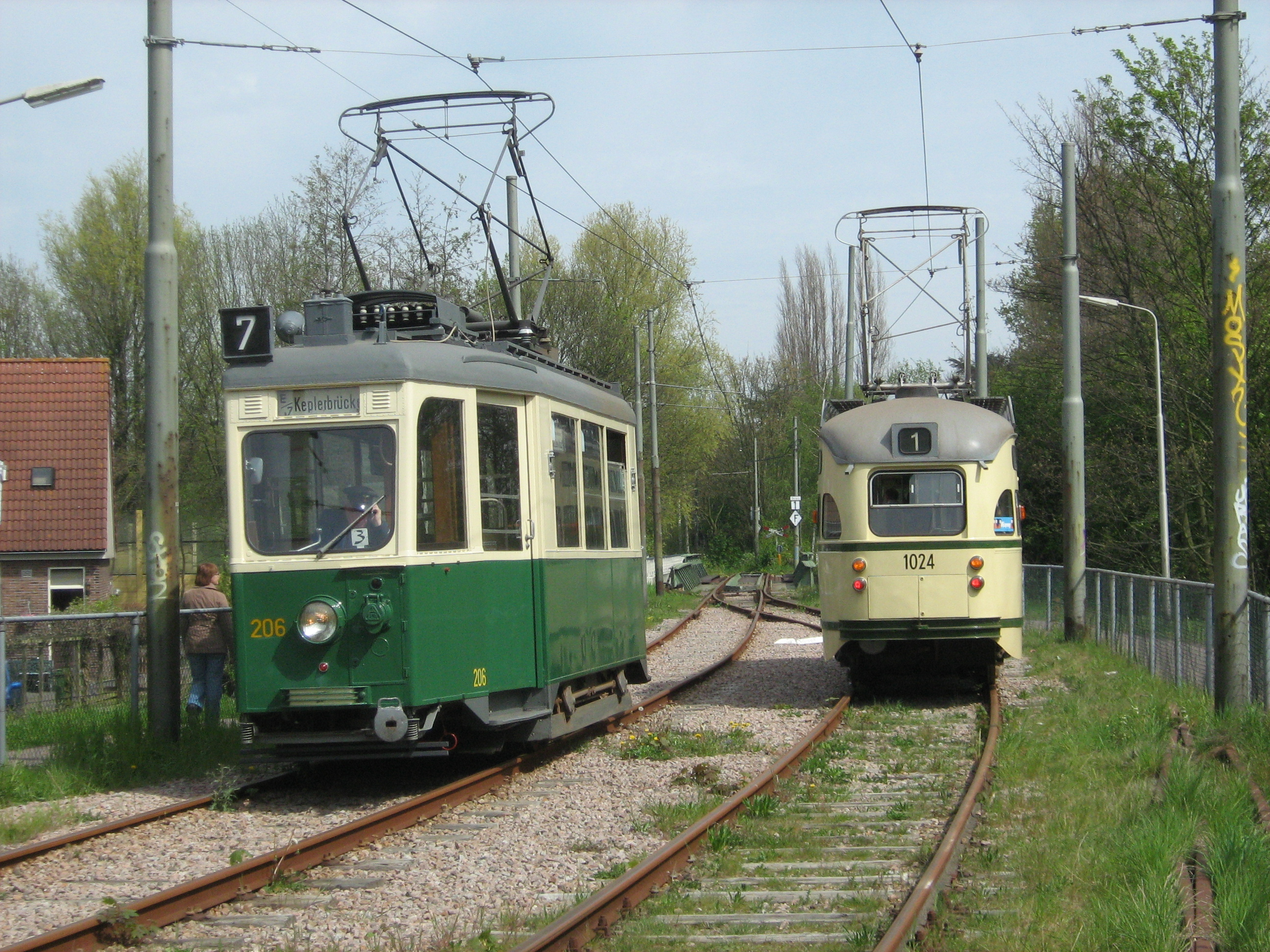
Grazer motor car 206 and the PCC-car 1024 Hague at Amstelveen Station

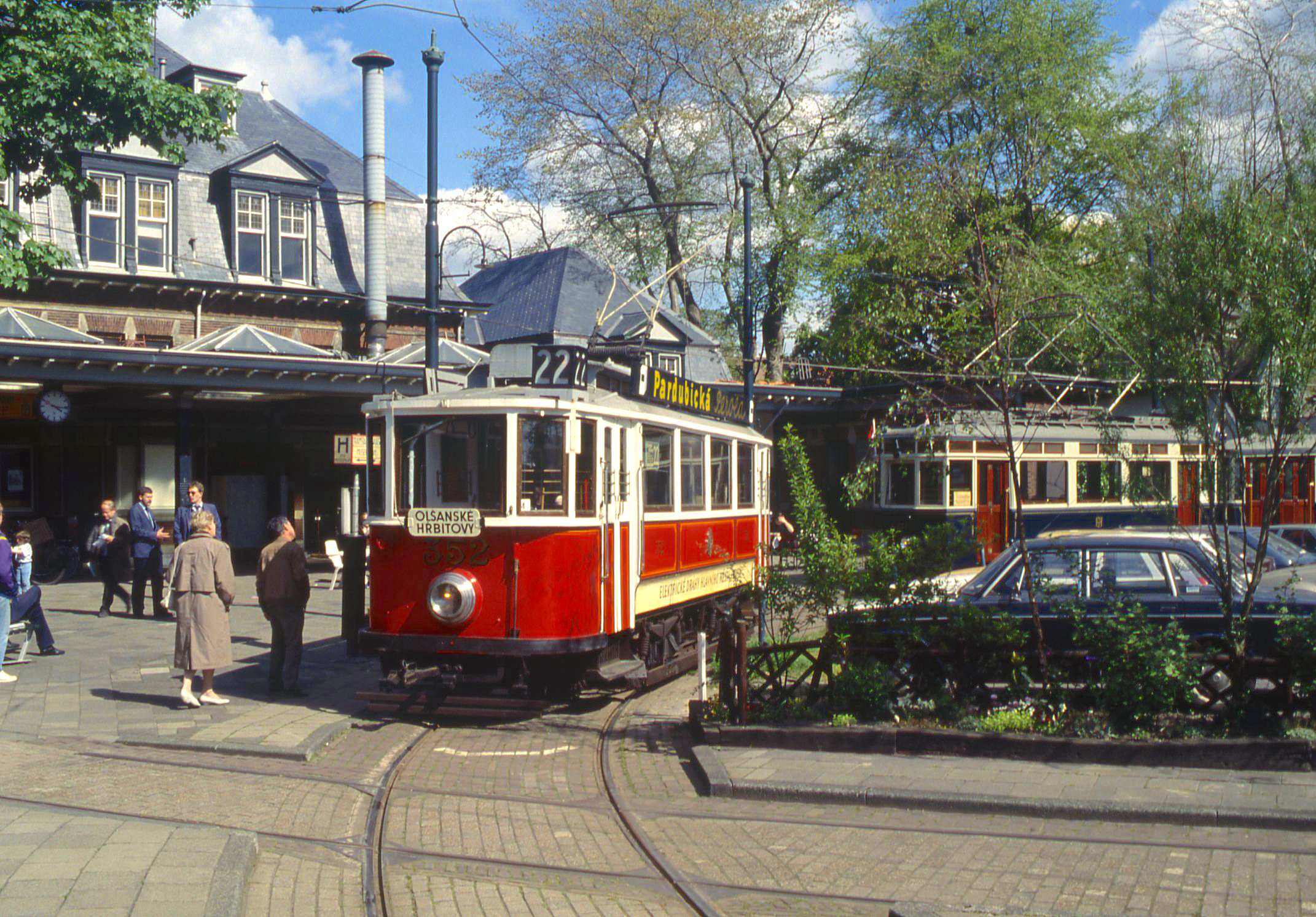
Prague motor car 352 at the Haarlemmermeer station.

=== Some images from the early days (1 June 1976) ===
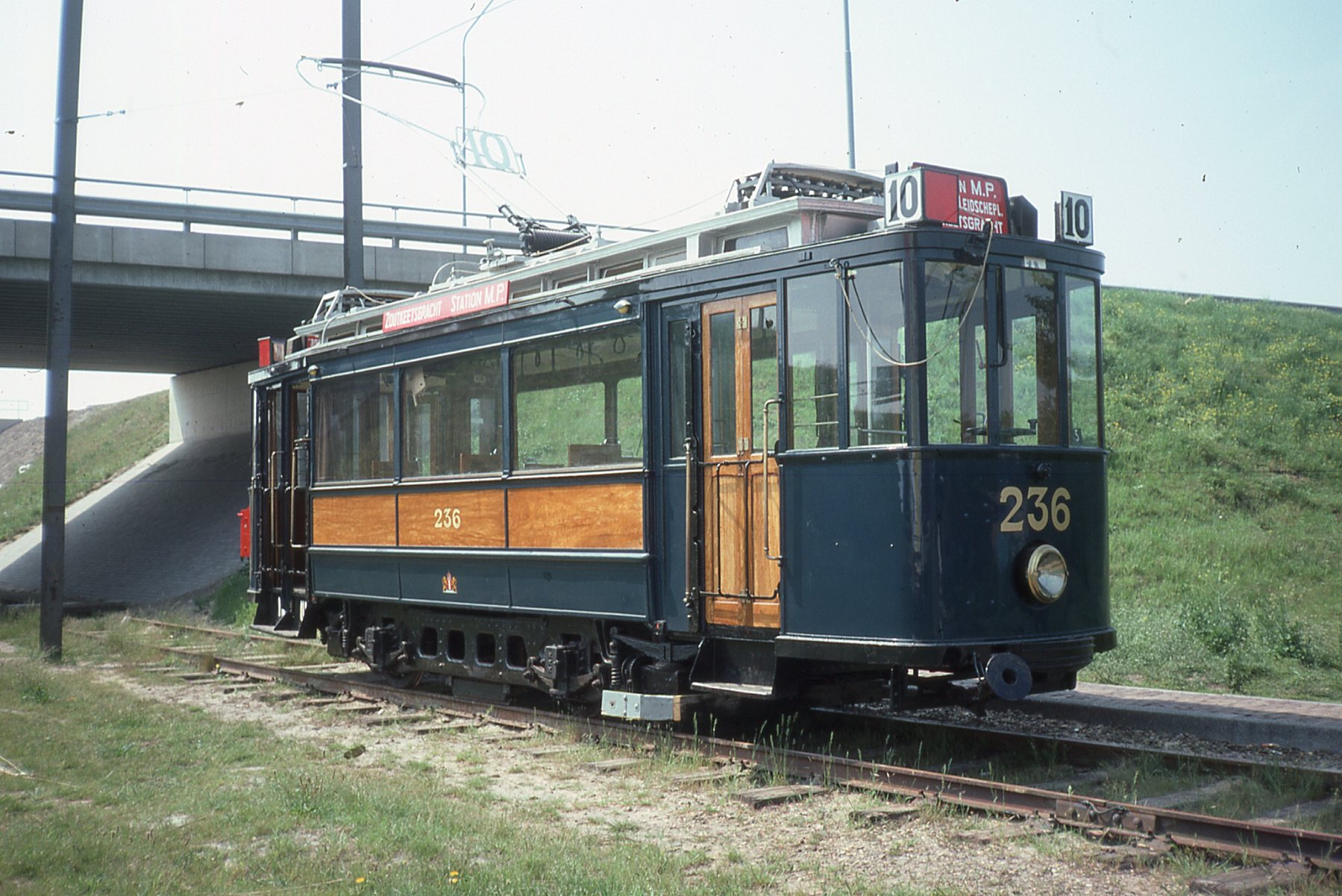
The Amsterdam motor car 236 at the Ringweg terminus (1975–1979).

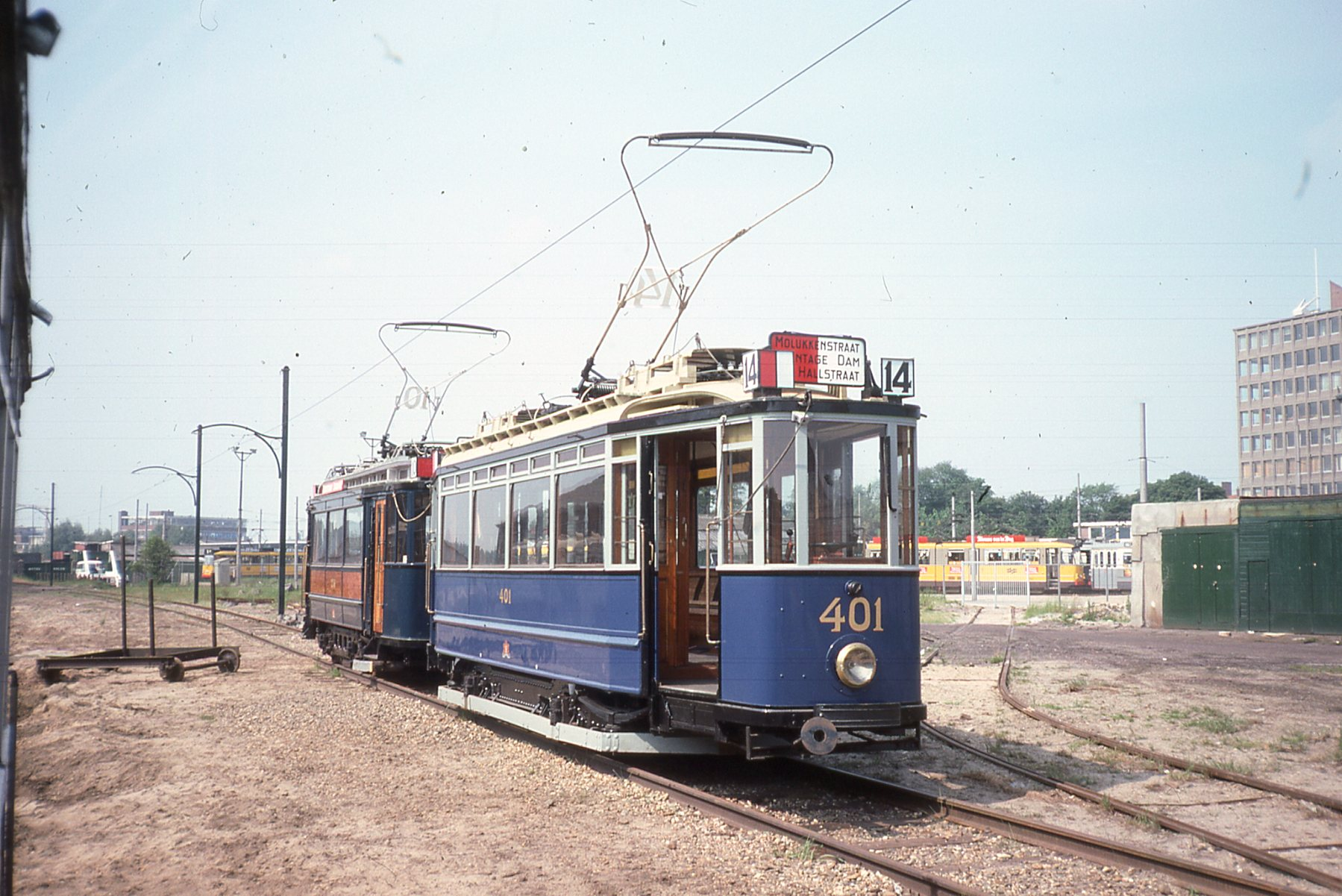
The Amsterdam motor cars 401 and 236 at the Karperweg yard. On the right is the track to the Havenstraat yard.

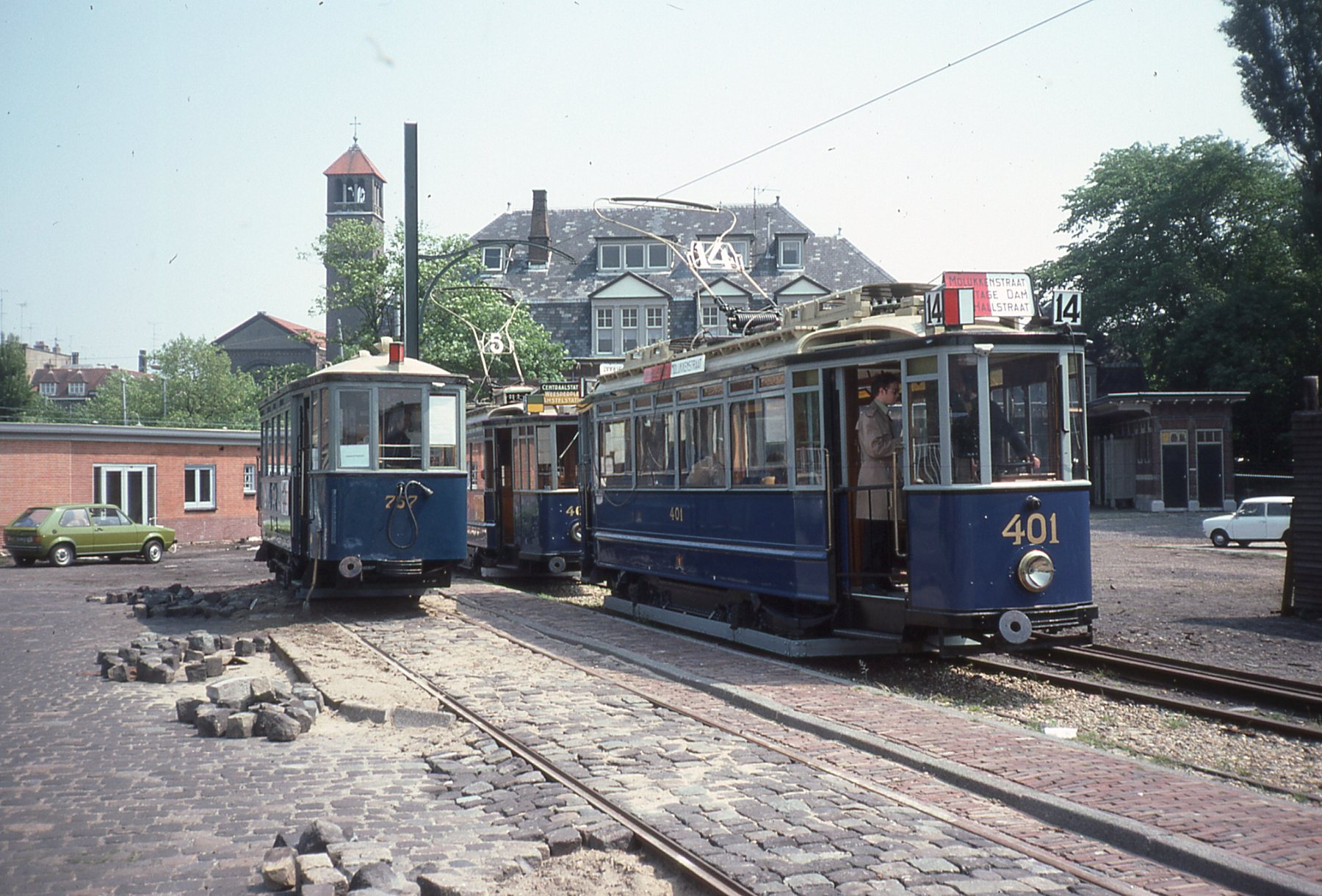
The Amsterdam motor car 465 and 857 at the Haarlemmermeer station.

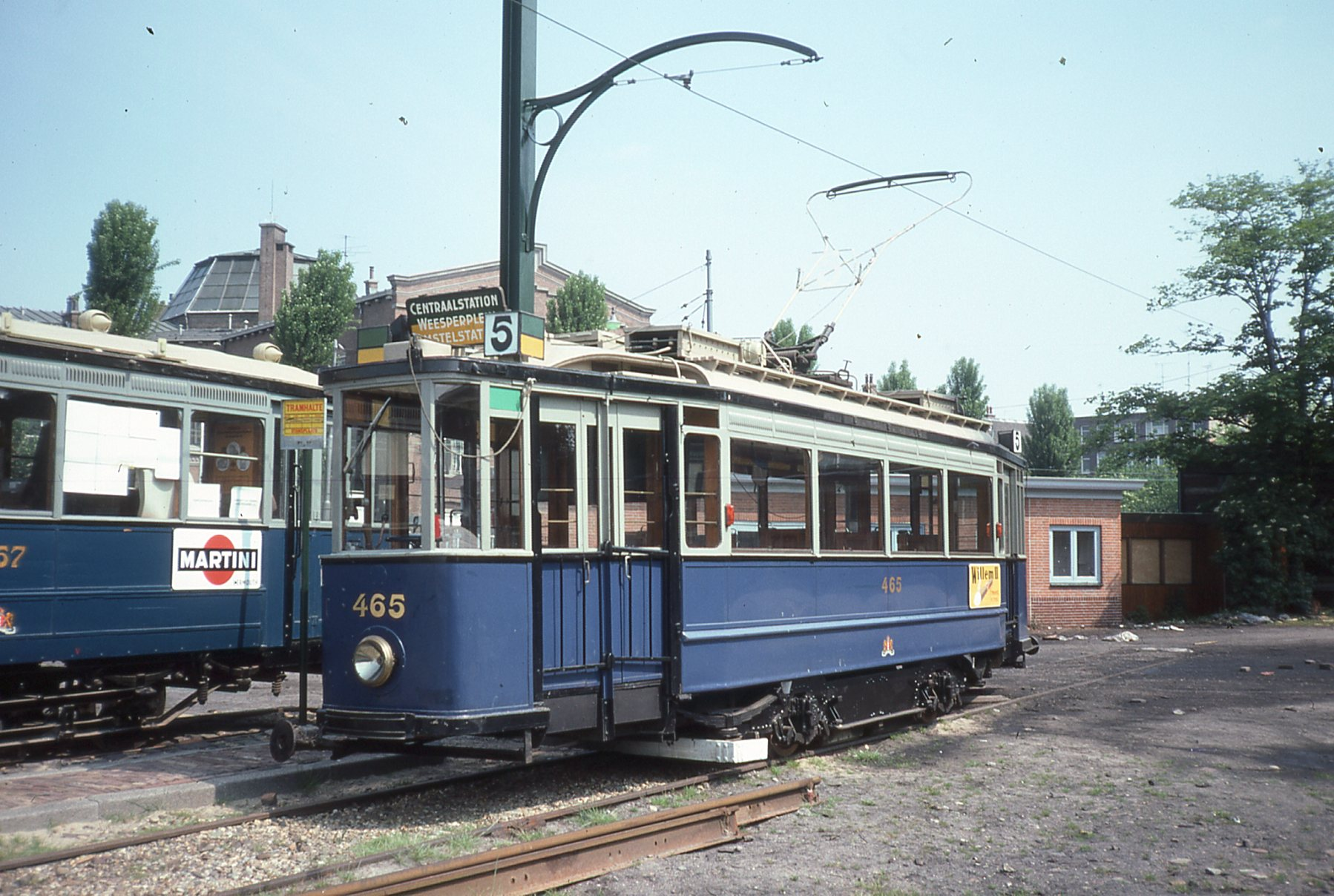
The Amsterdam motor car 465 and 757 at the Haarlemmermeer station.

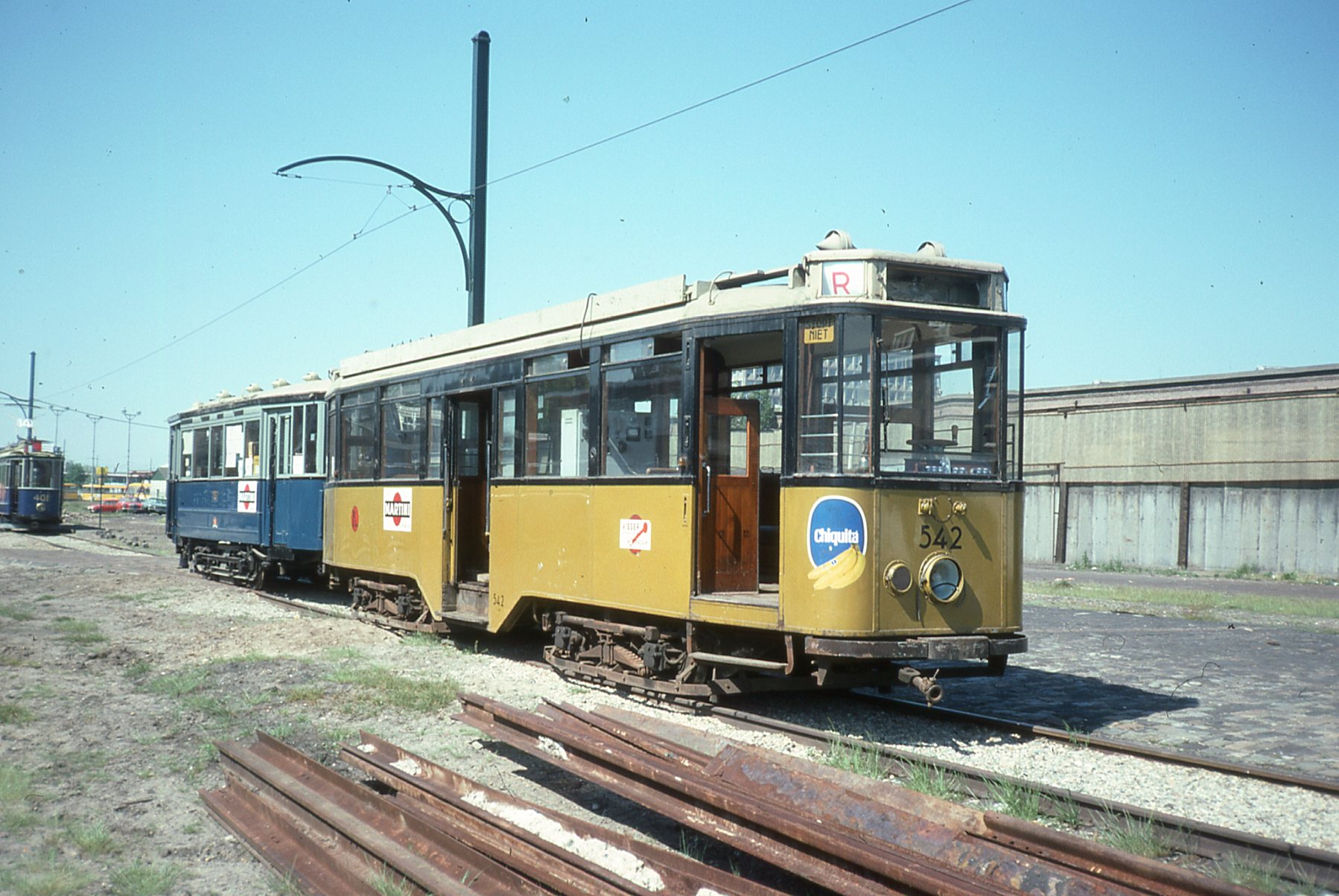
The Rotterdam diesel-electric car 542 and GVB 757 by the Karperweg yard.

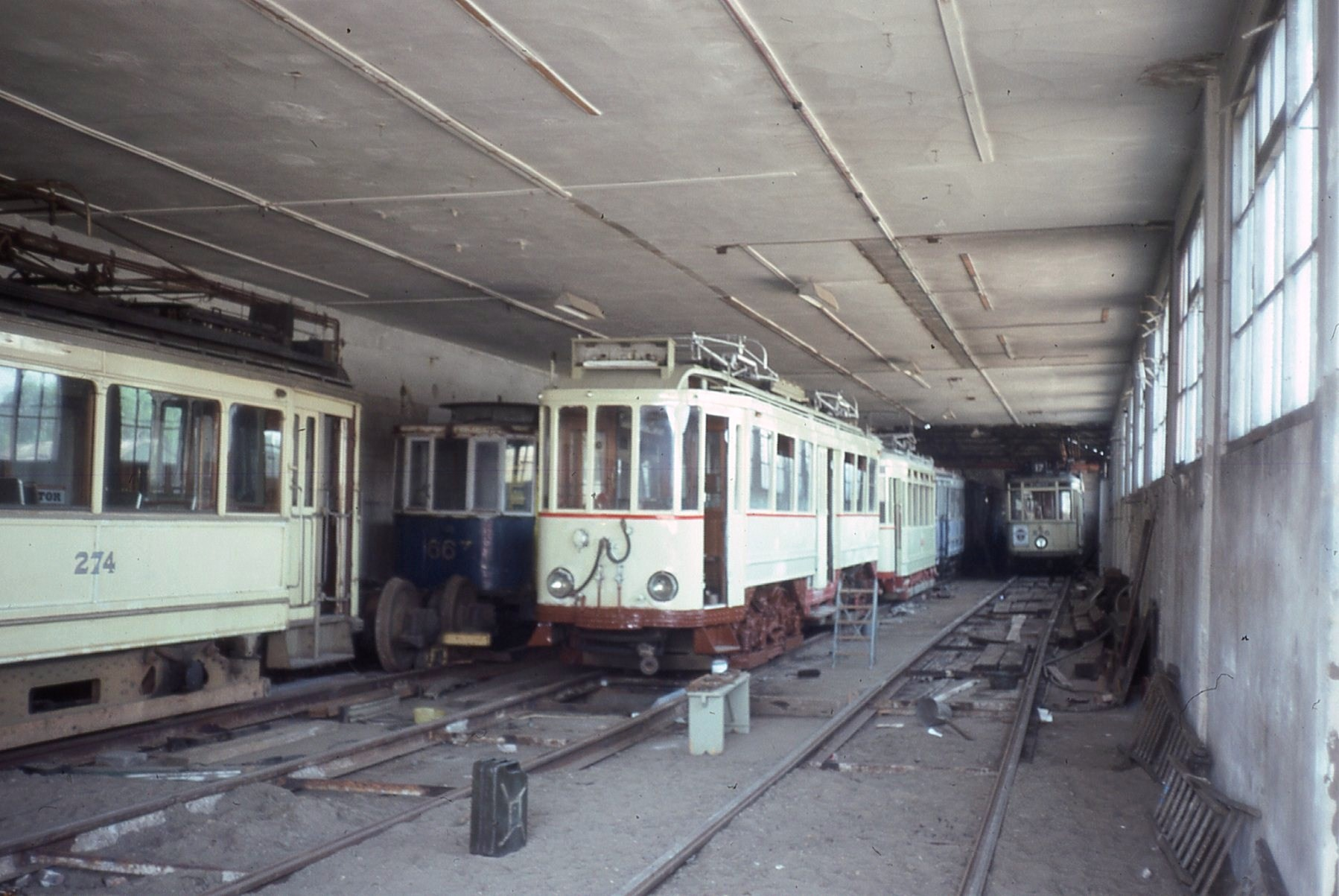
The cars of The Hague 274, 58, 824 and 826 in the Karperweg yard.

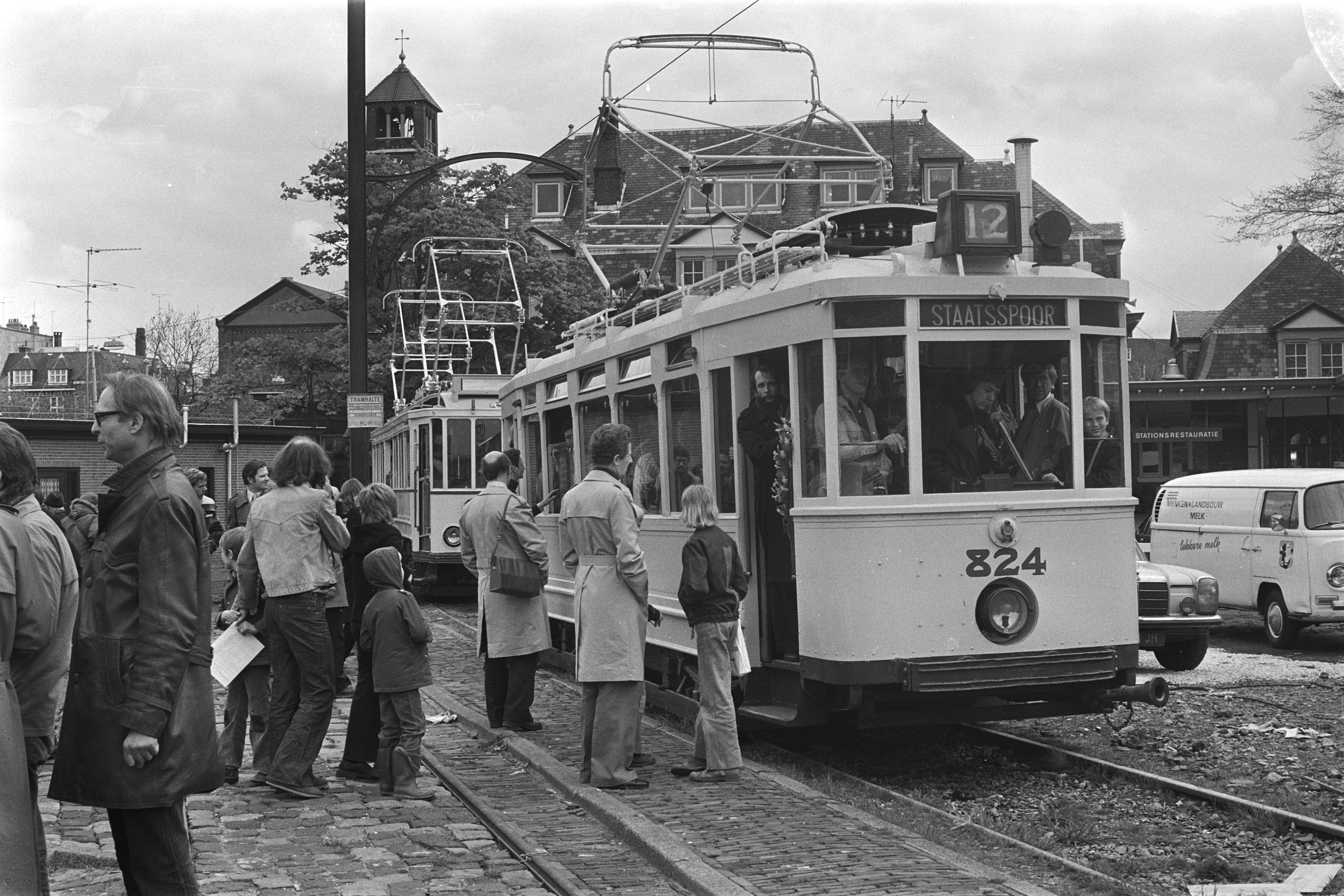
The Hague motor cars 824 and 58 at the Haarlemmermeer station; 14 May 1977.

== Literature ==
- TRAM; resp. OV-Toen; uitgave RETM, from 1981

== See also ==
- Amsterdam museum trams
