= Bovenkerk station =

Railway station in Amstelveen, the Netherlands

Bovenkerk
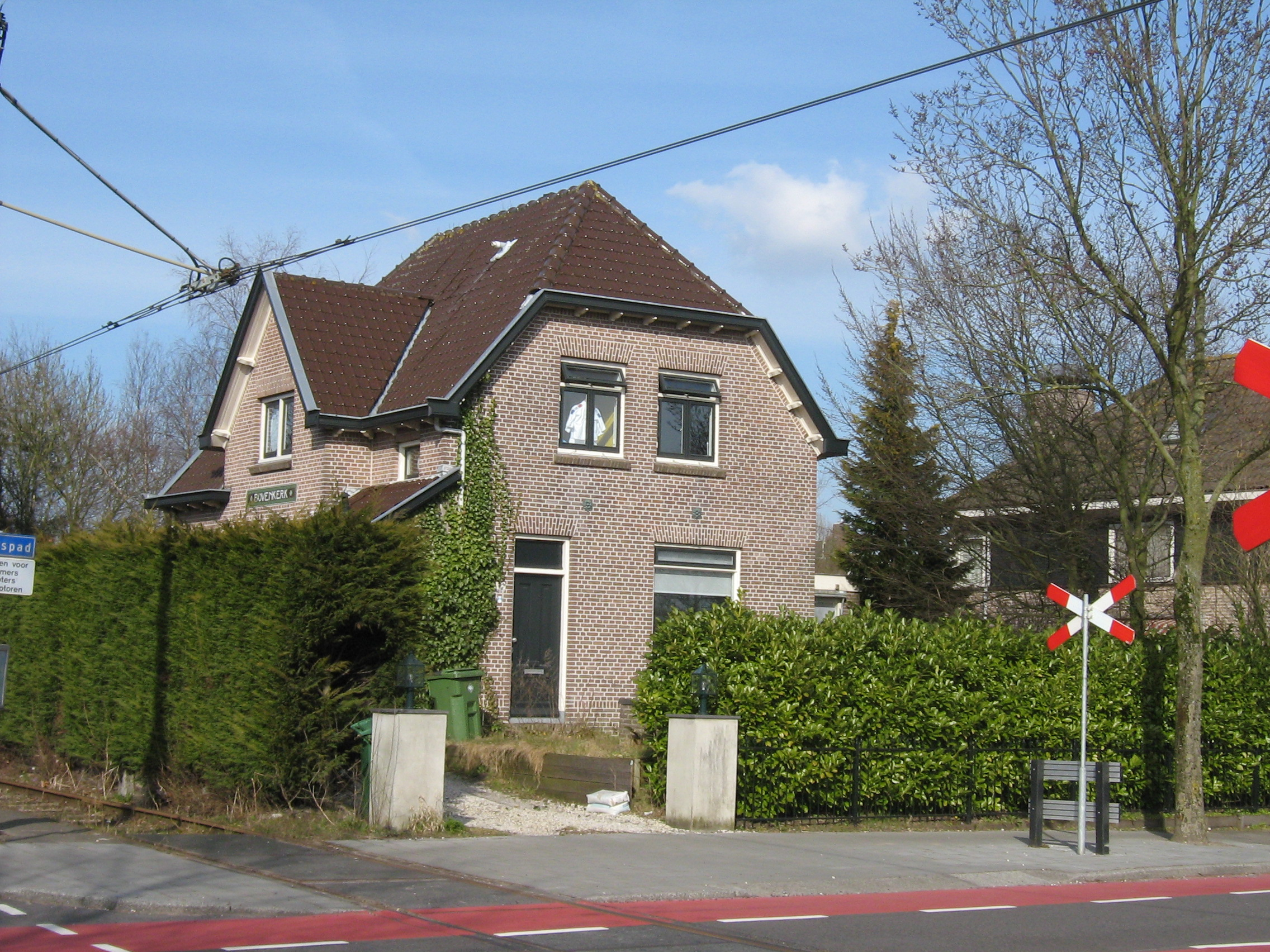

General information
- Location: Bovenkerk, Amstelveen; Netherlands
- Coordinates: 52°17′32″N 4°50′26″E
- System: Former Nederlandse Spoorwegen station Current heritage streetcar stop
- Operator: Nederlandse Spoorwegen (pre-1950); Electrische Museumtramlijn Amsterdam (currently)
- Lines: Amsterdam–Aalsmeer line Bovenkerk–Uithoorn line

History
- Opened: 1 May 1915
- Closed: 3 September 1950
- Rebuilt: 25 April 1997 (for heritage streetcar use)

Services
| Preceding station | Amsterdam Tram | Following station |
|---|---|---|
| Terminus | Line 30 Temporarily suspended | Handweg towards Jan Wils Bridge |
Location

Bovenkerk station is a former railway station in Bovenkerk near Amstelveen. The stop was a fork of the former Haarlemmermeer railway lines. The railway lines split at Amstelveen station into two single-track lines that branched south of Bovenkerk: the Amsterdam–Aalsmeer line and the Bovenkerk–Uithoorn line.

At the stop is a house (no. 31) of the HESM track guard, which still exists and is in use as a home. On the facade is the name Bovenkerk in a tiled tableau. The building on the Noorddammerlaan dates from 1913 and is now a municipal monument. In 1950, the passenger transport stop was closed. The section Bovenkerk – Aalsmeer Oost was broken up; the part between Amsterdam and Uithoorn remained in use for freight transport until 28 May 1972. In 1987 the part south of Upper Church was also broken up.

The part between the Haarlemmermeer station in Amsterdam and the Bovenkerk stop came into use in five phases at the Electrische Museumtramlijn Amsterdam. Since 25 April 1997, the museum tram has been running until Bovenkerk.

For the purpose of the museum tram, a passing loop and a wye has been built south of the Noorddammerlaan, located on the old embanks south of the fork with a tight connection arch. Here is also a double railway guard house (No. 37), which still exists and is used as a home.

Service to Bovenkerk and all other stations south of Parklaan is currently temporarily suspended.
