= Amstelveen station =

Railway station in Amstelveen, the Netherlands

Amstelveen
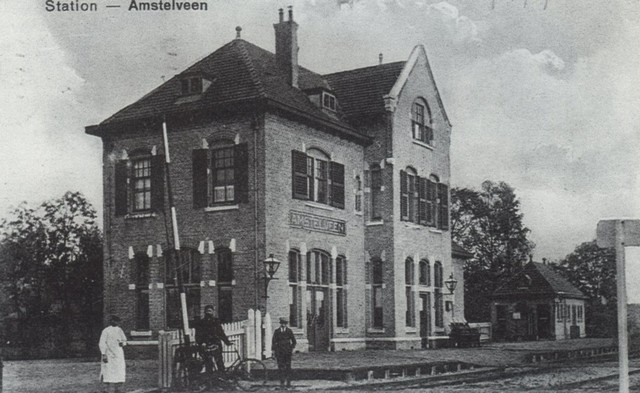

General information
- Location: Stationsstraat 28; Amstelveen; Netherlands
- Coordinates: 52°18′05.9″N 4°50′51.9″E
- System: Former Nederlandse Spoorwegen station Current heritage streetcar stop
- Operator: Nederlandse Spoorwegen (pre-1950); Electrische Museumtramlijn Amsterdam (currently)
- Line: Amsterdam–Aalsmeer line

History
- Opened: 1 May 1915
- Closed: 3 September 1950
- Rebuilt: 3 April 1983 (for heritage streetcar use)

Services
| Preceding station | Amsterdam Tram | Following station |
|---|---|---|
| Handweg towards Bovenkerk | Line 30 Temporarily suspended | Parklaan towards Jan Wils Bridge |
Location
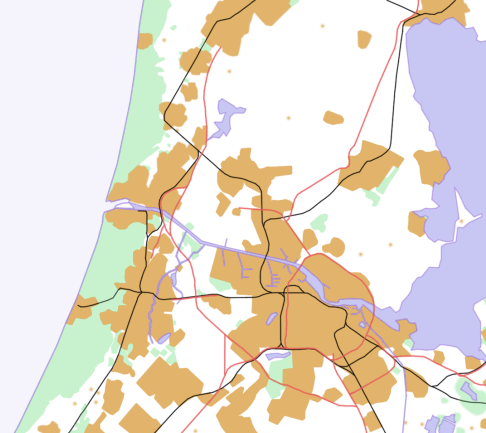
- Location within Northern Randstad Location within Netherlands

Amstelveen station is a former railway station at Stationsstraat 28 in Amstelveen.

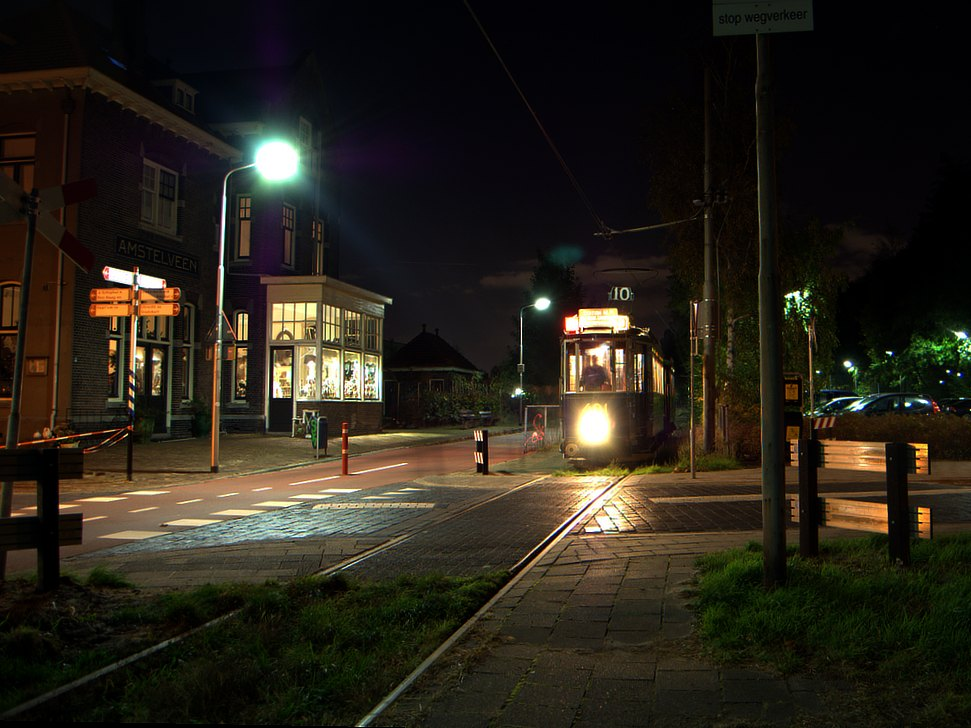
Amstelveen Station is now a stop for the EMA.

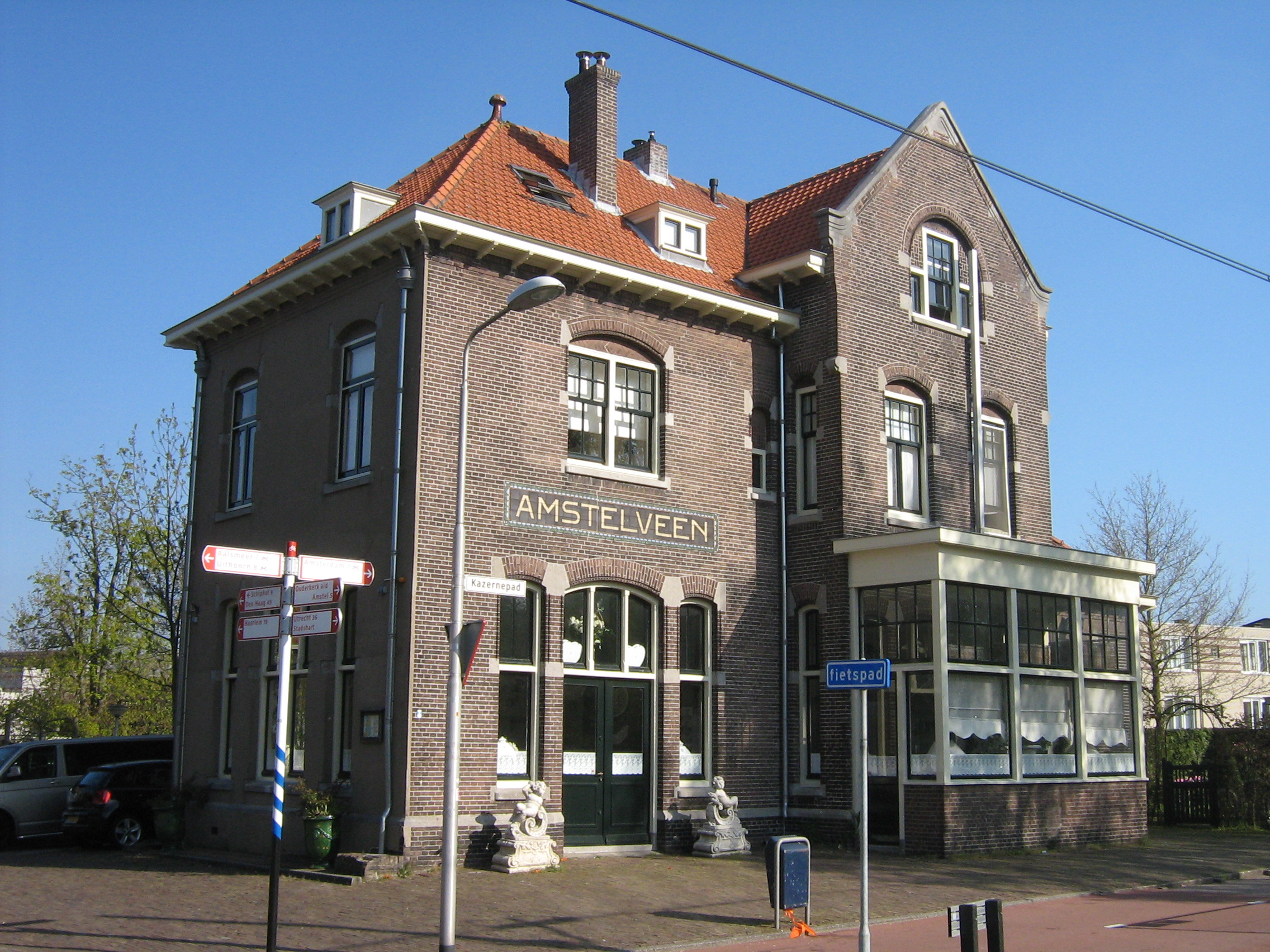
Amstelveen Station

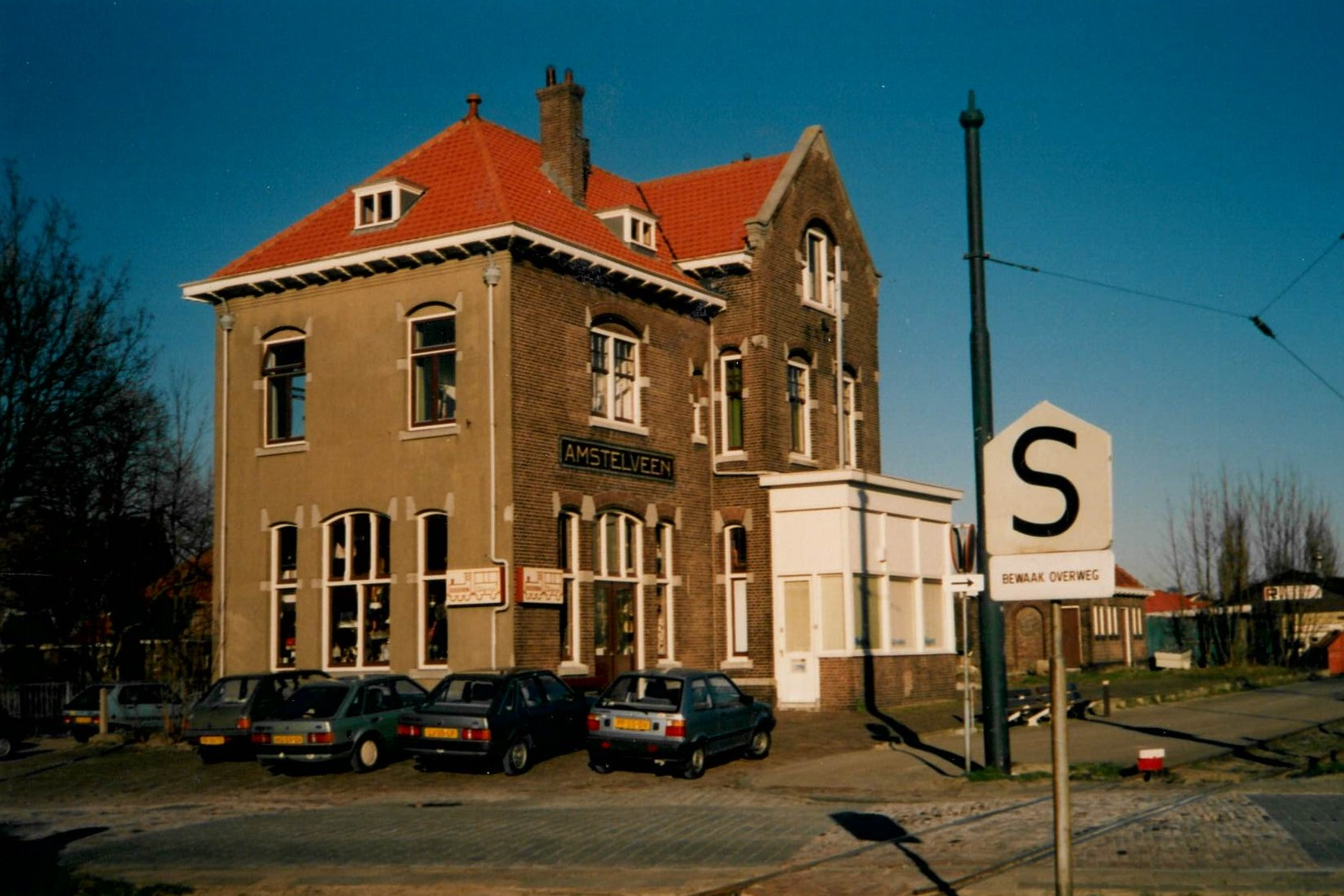
Amstelveen Station in 1991

The station, of the Standard HESM type, was located on the Amsterdam–Aalsmeer line, and was opened on 1 May 1915. On 3 September 1950 the station was closed to passenger transport. It was still used for freight transport until 27 May 1972.

Since 3 April 1983 the Electrische Museumtramlijn Amsterdam has a stop here. Until 25 April 1997, this was also the terminus of the museum tram. On the north side, at the viaduct on Rijksweg 9, a changeover has been built.

The station building has remained and has been a municipal monument since 1998. The building underwent a refurbishment in 2010 and is used as a shop and living space. Amstelveen Station is known in Sweden from children's books as the Monsterstation, as described by the writer Johan Elfner, who also runs a hotel at this location.

Service to Amstelveen and all other stations south of Parklaan is currently suspended.

== See also ==
- Municipal monument in the Netherlands
