= Haarlemmermeer railway lines =

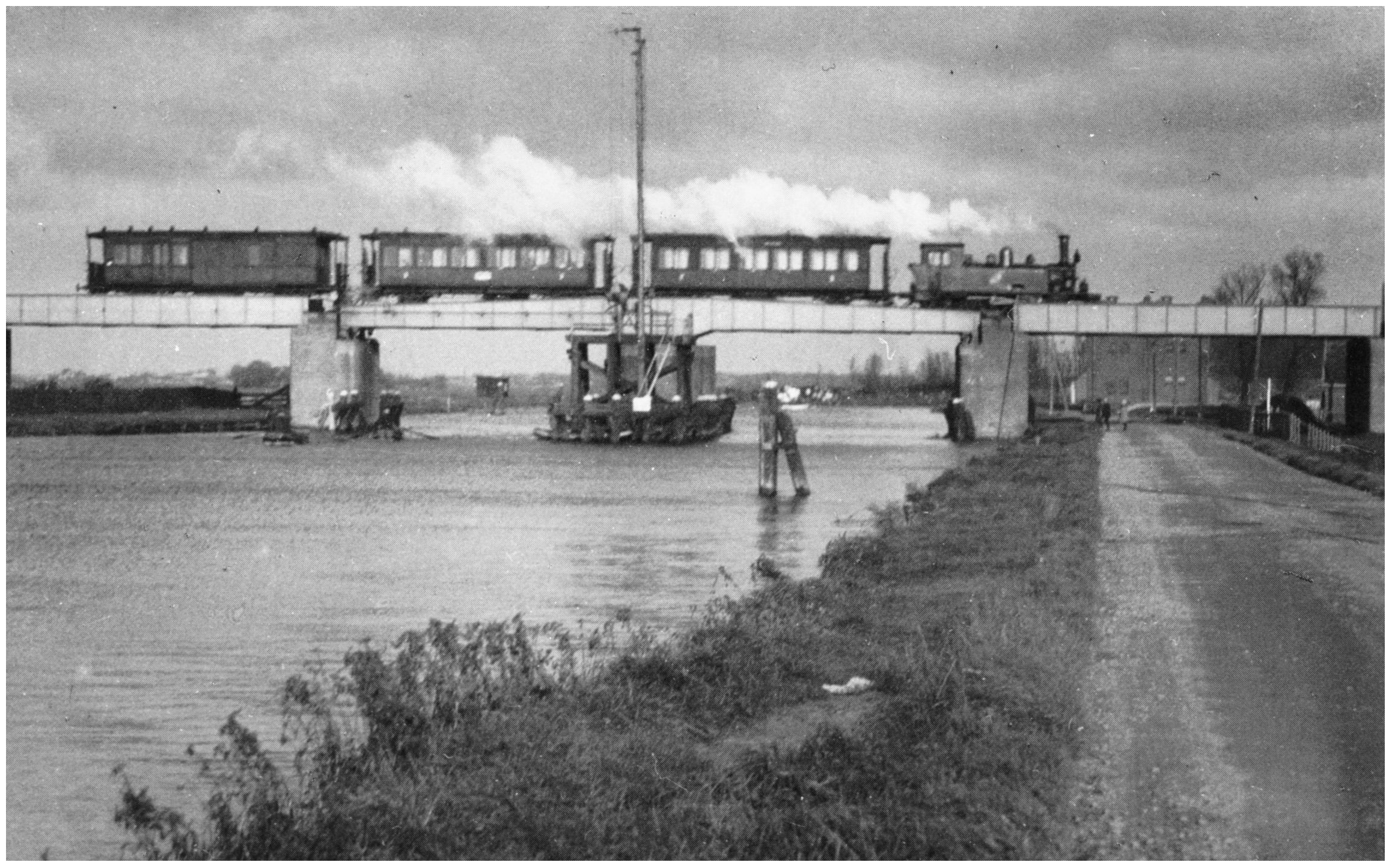
Steam train over the swing bridge over the Zijl near Leiden, on the Leiden-Heerensingel route, around 1930

Overview of the network circa 1930. A few smaller stop had already been closed; the temporary track to Schiphol is indicated but was not yet actually in existence.

The Haarlemmermeer railway lines (Dutch: Haarlemmermeerspoorlijnen) are a former network of railway lines in the area between Haarlem, Amsterdam, Utrecht and Leiden. Despite the name they did not all travel over the territory that formerly comprise the Haarlemmermeer lake before it was drained.

== History ==
The first plans for railway lines through the Haarlemmermeer polder were presented in 1864 by mayor Amersfoort, twelve years after the dredging of the lake and creation of the polder. However, none of the plans was executed. In 1898 the HESM (Hollandsche Electrische-Spoorweg-Maatschappij, "Holland Electric Railway Company") was established with the goal of building electric railways in the area between South Amsterdam and Haarlem. After the HSM bought up the shares, the plans were changed and this led, in the end, to the establishment of a local network of steam railways.

The lines were built by the HESM. Despite the name including the term "electric", the lines were never electrified. Only steam trains served for passenger traffic.

The first lines opened in 1912, almost a half century after the first plans were drawn up. The lines lay in the area between Amsterdam, Haarlem, Leiden, Alphen aan den Rijn and Nieuwersluis, and were opened between 1912 and 1918. Because of the 1930s Depression, various lines were closed after only two decades. Only the Amsterdam Haarlemmermeerstation – Amstelveen – Aalsmeer and Bovenkerk – Uithoorn – Nieuwersluis lines remained in service for passenger and cargo traffic.

The last passenger train ran in 1950. In 1972 the lines were closed for freight, except for the Amsterdam – Uithoorn route, which remained in service between 1976 and 1981 to transport building materials for the new Schiphollijn (which originally had no connection to the rest of the national railway network) and Uithoorn – Nieuwersluis, which remained in service until 1986 to serve the Koek scrapyard in Mijdrecht, where the Dutch Railways demolished a lot of equipment.

The lines have, in the meantime, all been dug up, with the exception of the Amsterdam – Amstelveen – Bovenkerk line, which was electrified between 1975 and 1997 and is used by the Electric Tramway Museum Amsterdam.

In many places there are still the remains of dikes, and various stations and stops are still recognizable and used as residences, including stations in Amsterdam, Amstelveen, Aalsmeer, Uithoorn, Hoofddorp, Mijdrecht, Nieuwveen, Wilnis and Aarlanderveen.

In September 2004, the Amstelveen light rail line was extended from Poortwachter to Westwijk and reused the embankment of the old Bovenkerk–Uithoorn line on the curve west of Spinnerij to the south of Westwijk. Plans exist to extend the Amstelveen line to Uithoorn. In Uithoorn part of the old railway dike is in use as a bus lane. Further south, portions of the railway dike have been used as rights of way for new provincial highways.

== Image gallery of stations ==
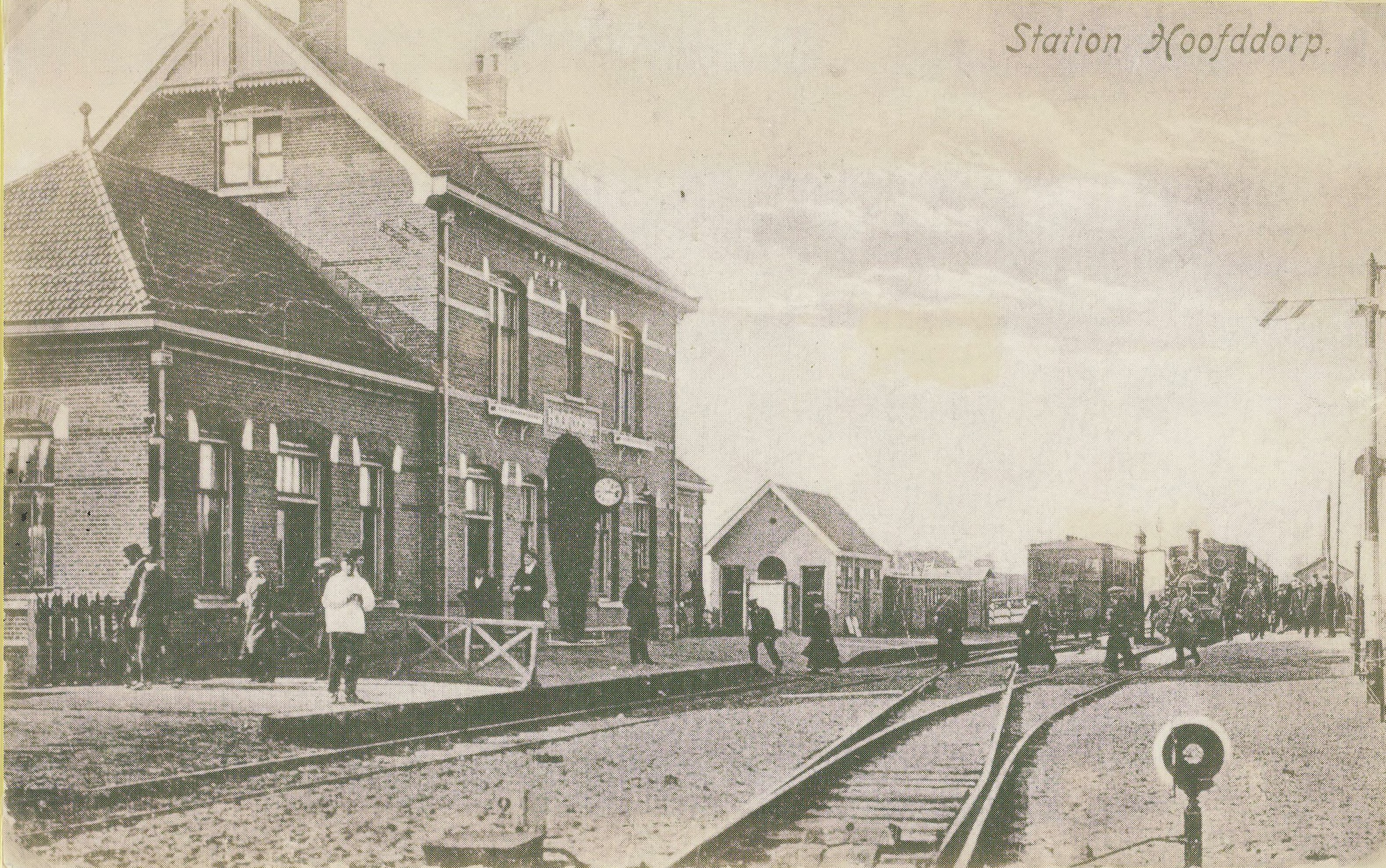
Hoofddorp station circa 1912

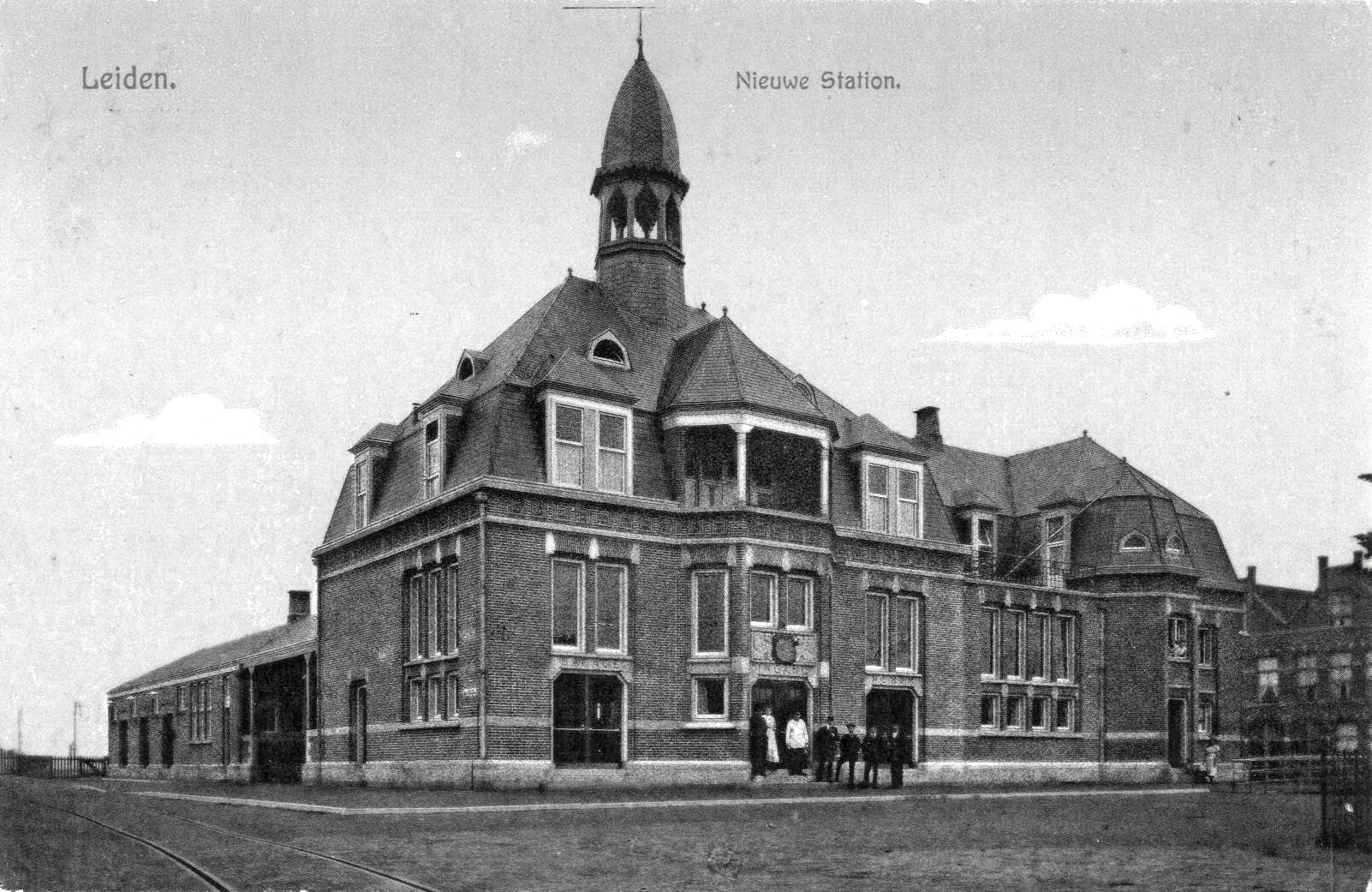
Leiden Herensingel station circa 1912

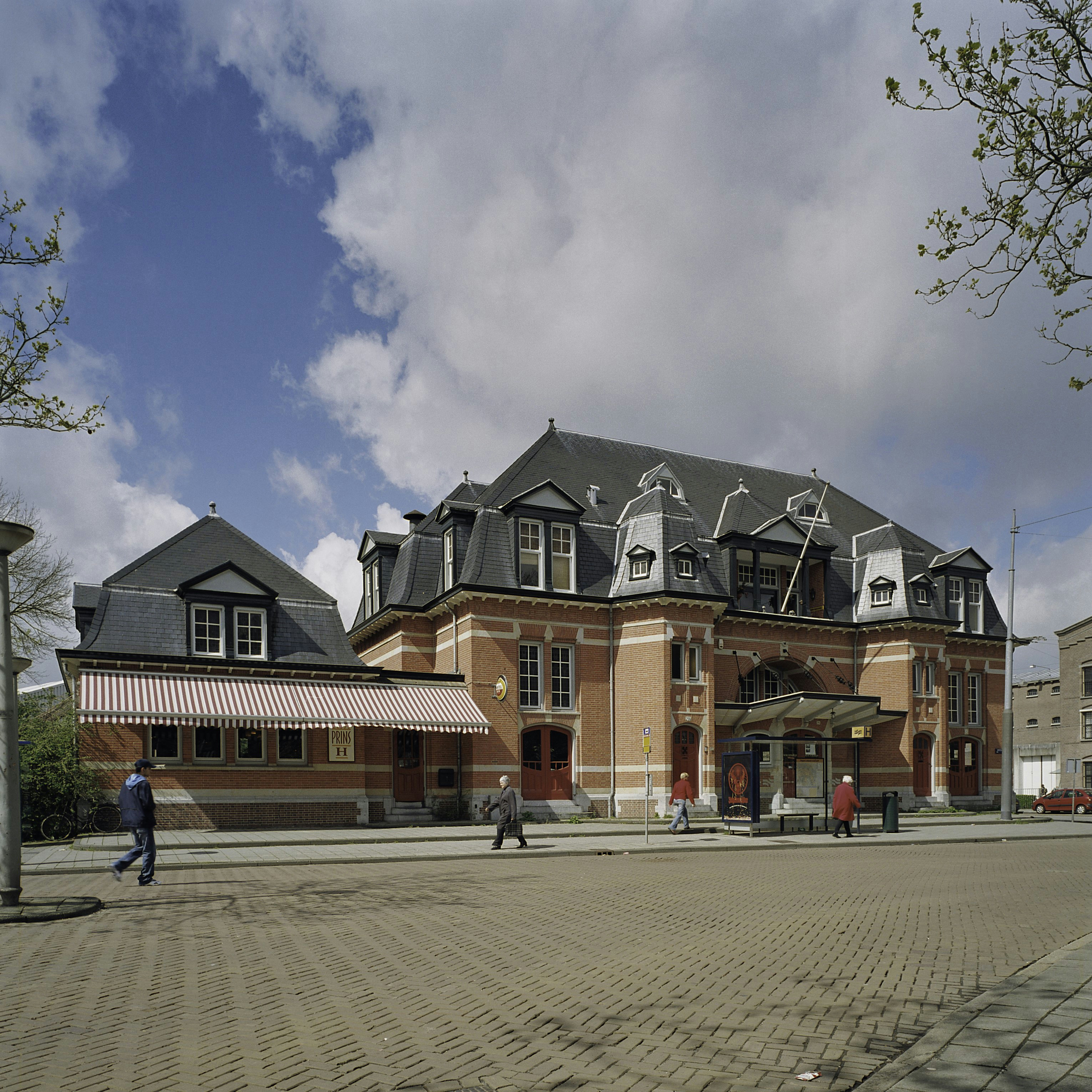
Amsterdam Haarlemmermeer station

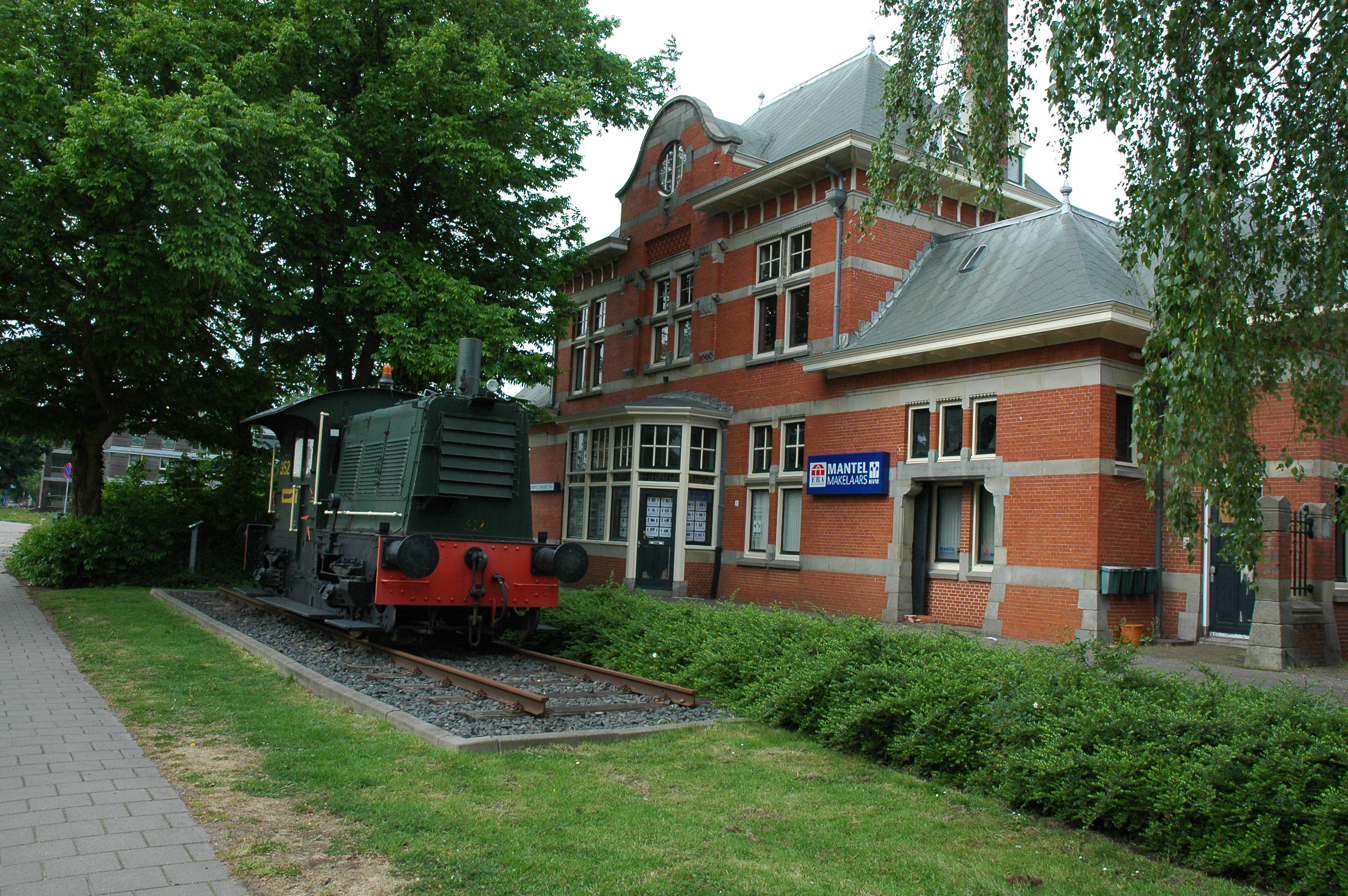
Aalsmeer station

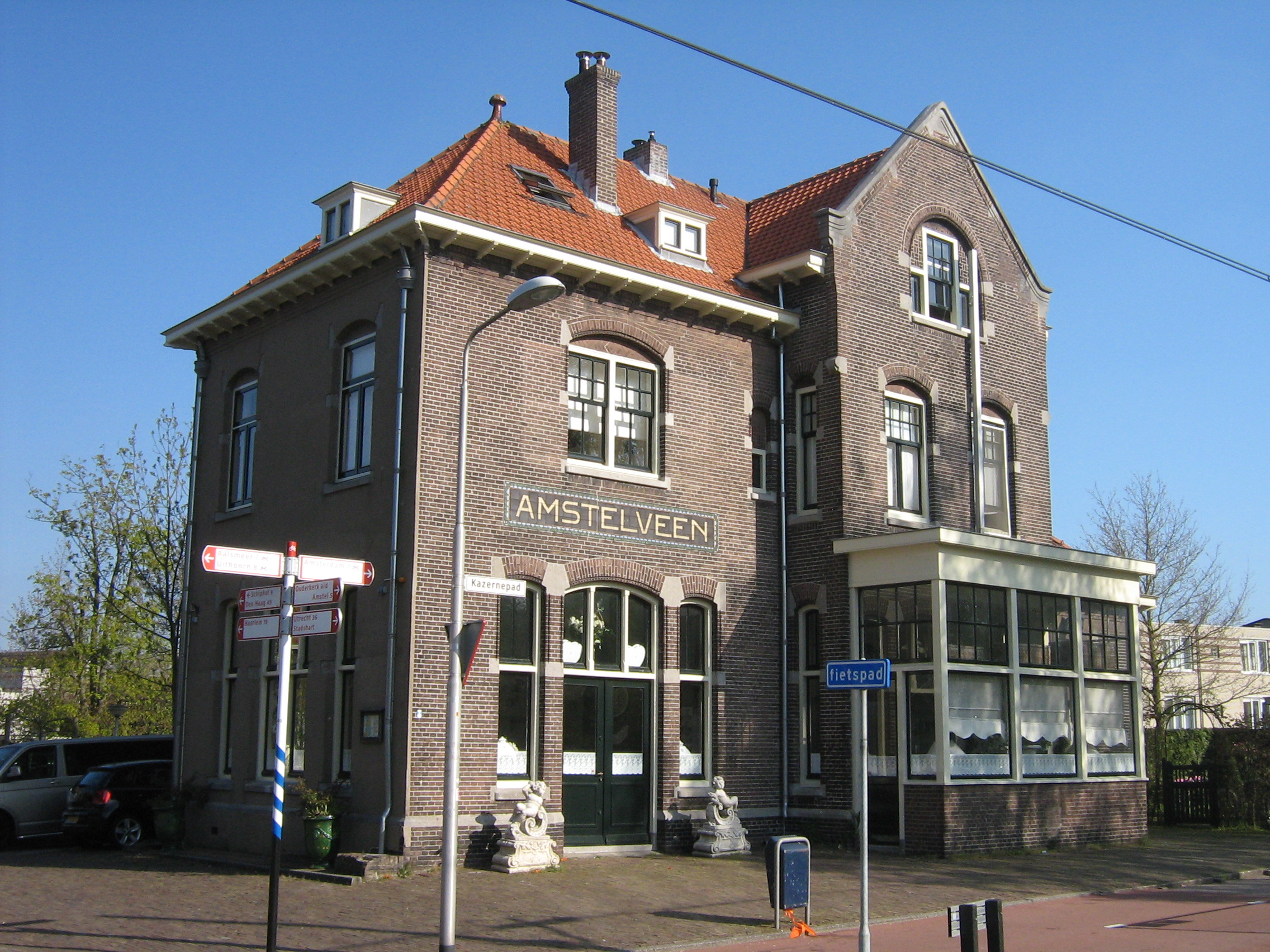
Amstelveen station

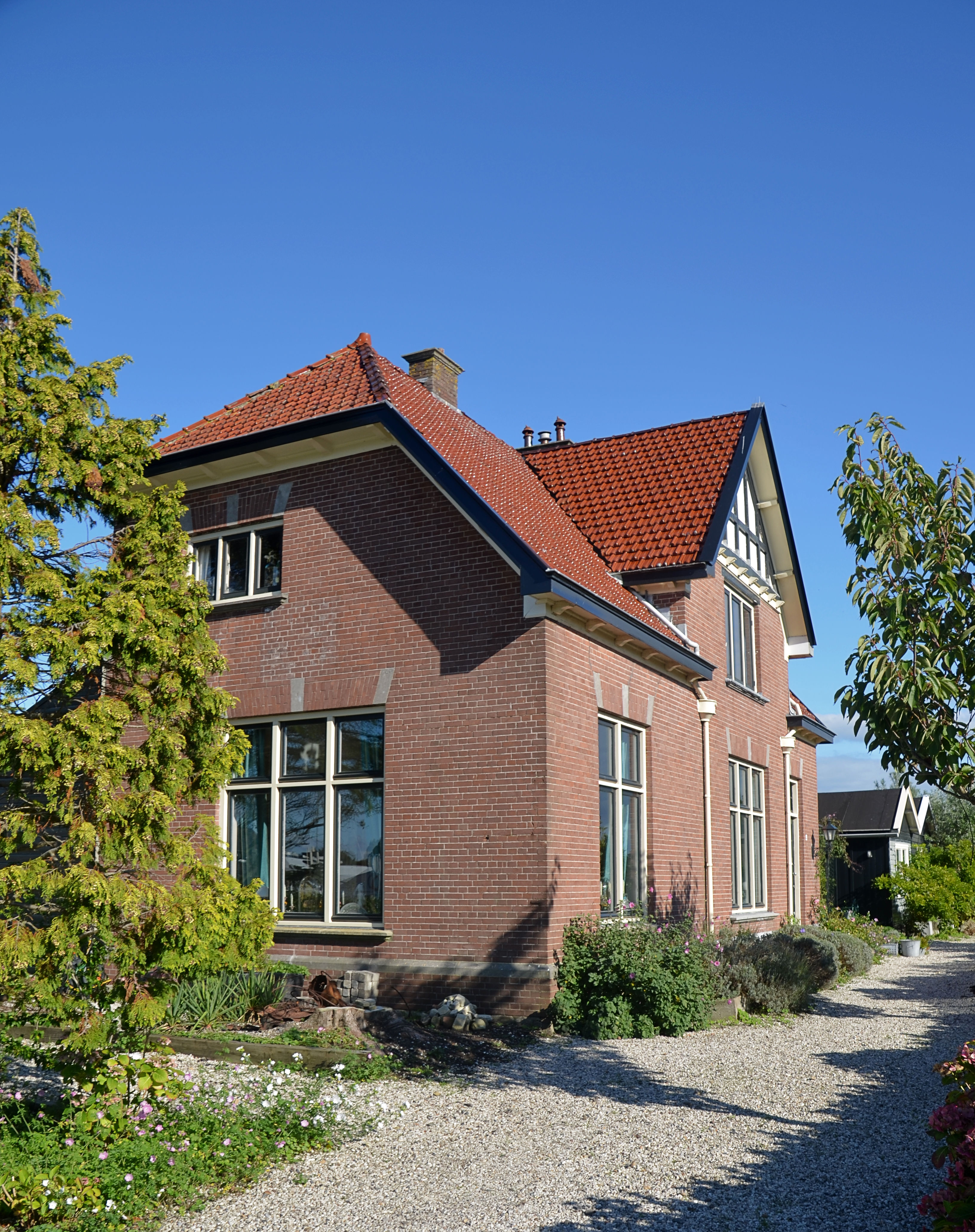
De Kwakel stop

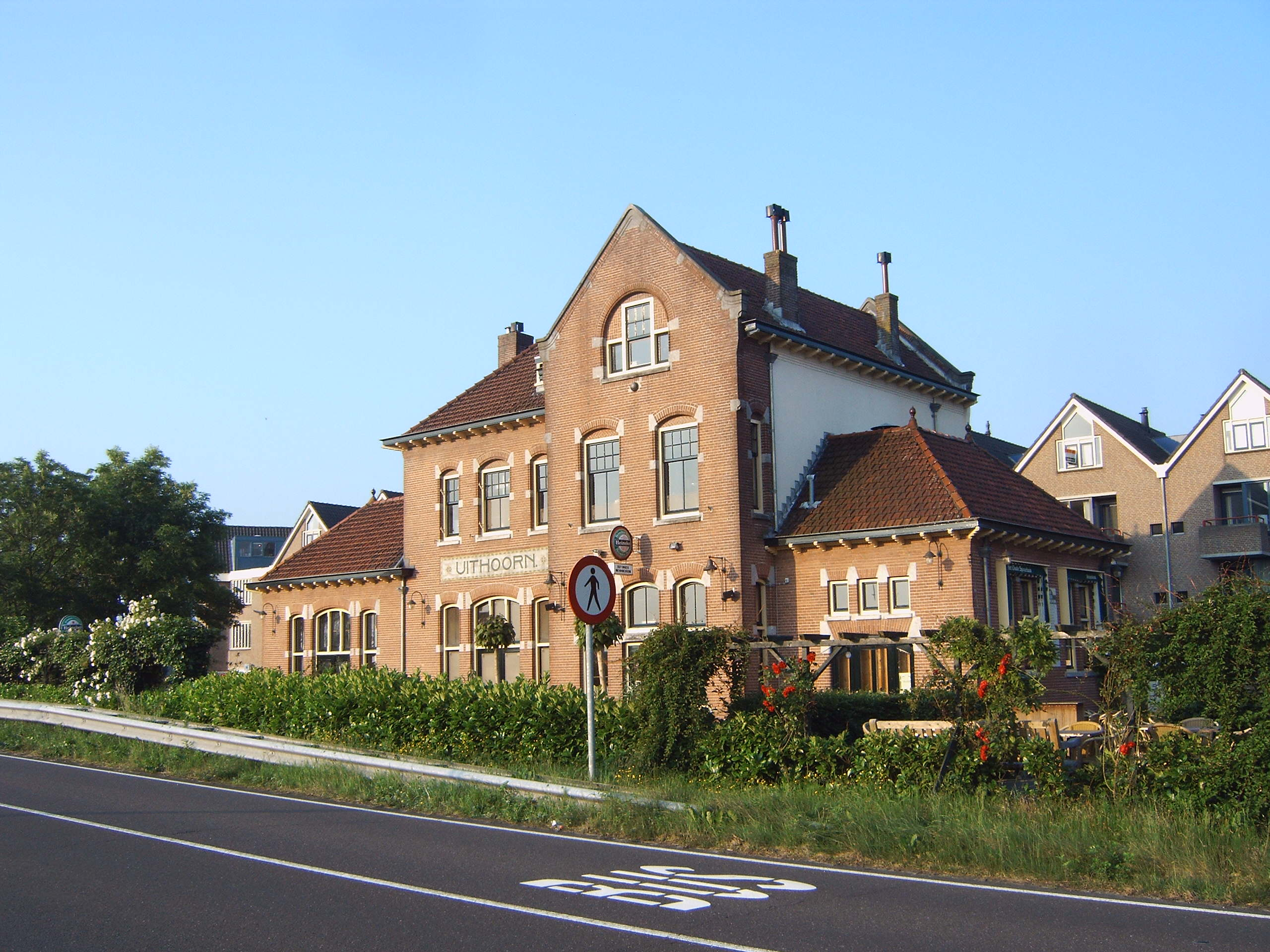
Uithoorn station

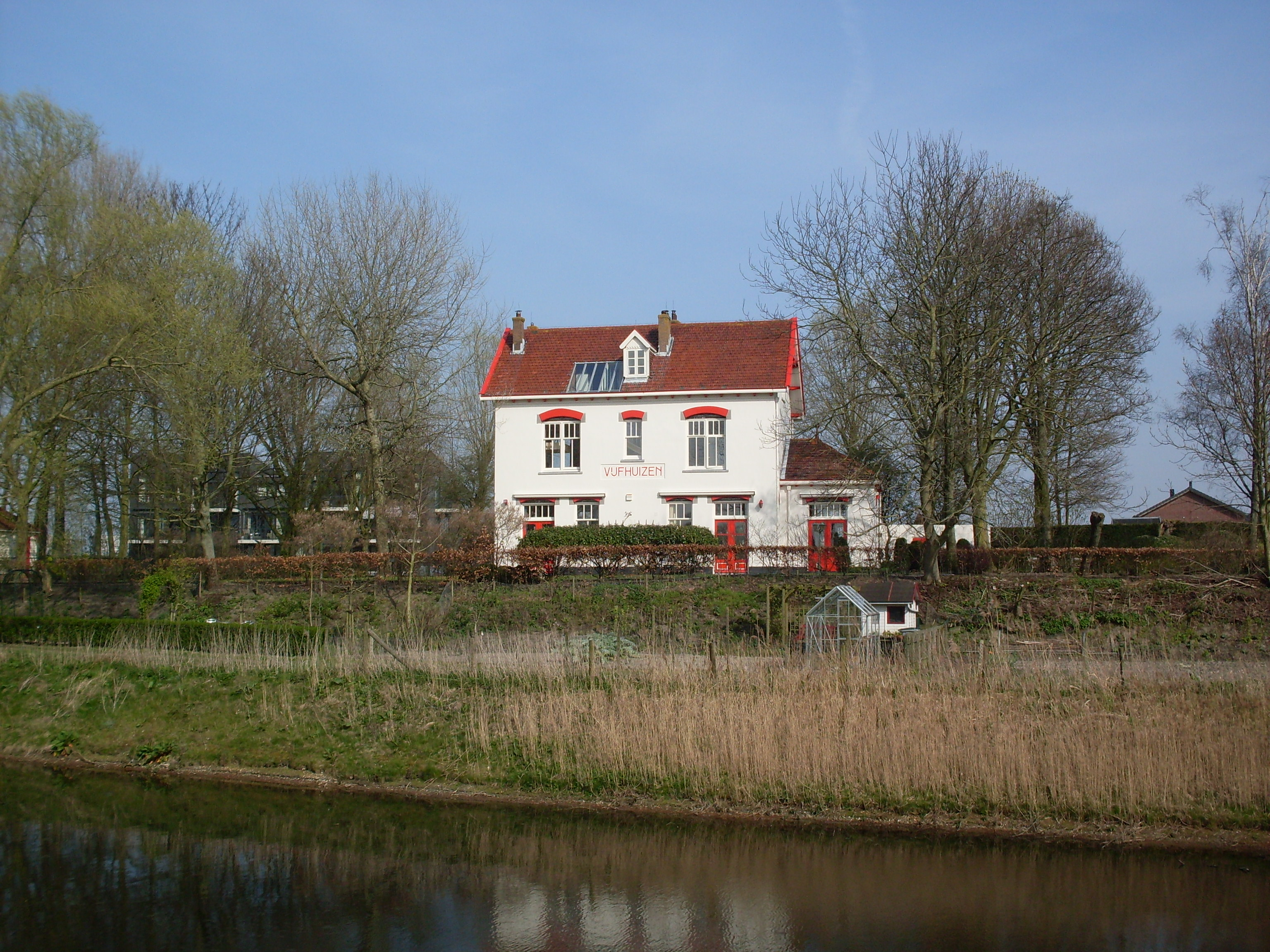
Vijhuizen station

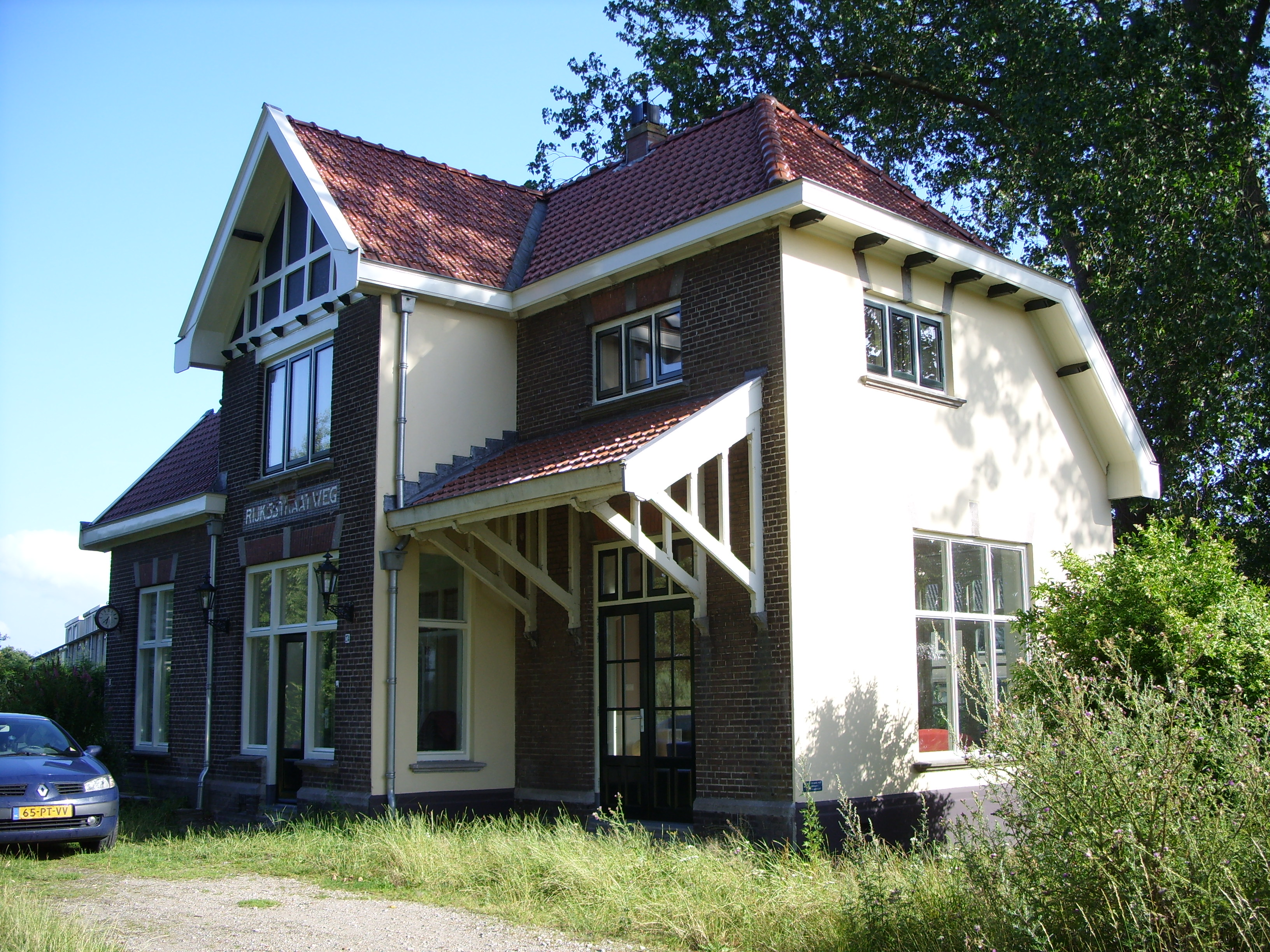
Rijksstraatweg stop

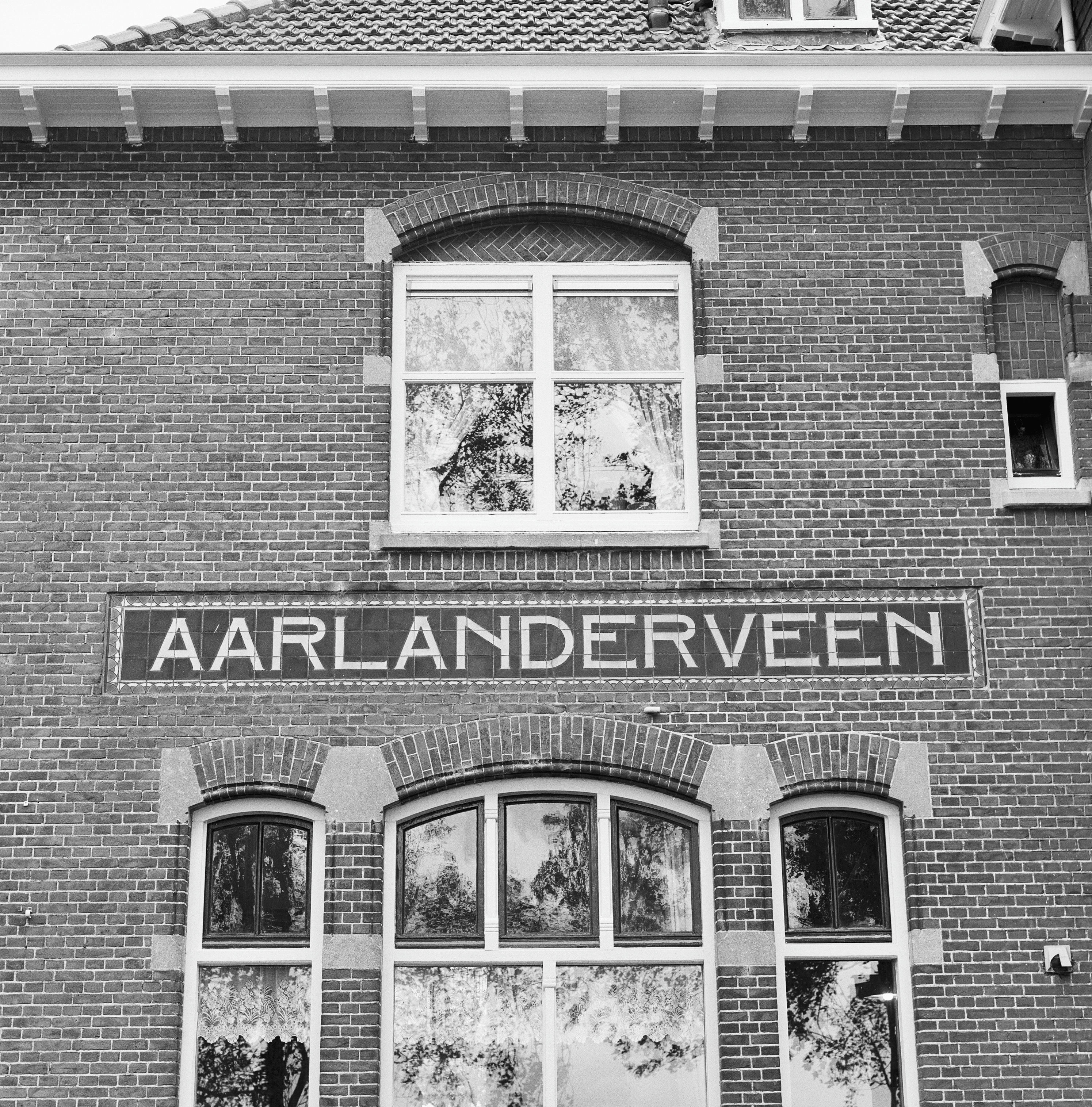
Aarlanderveen station tile sign

== Sources ==
- De Haarlemmermeerspoorlijnen
- Stationsweb
- De Haarlemmermeerspoorlijnen in oude ansichten. Auteur: A.W.J. de Jonge. Europese Bibliotheek, Zaltbommel, 1982 / 2000. ISBN 90-288-1960-6
- Sporen: Een zoektocht langs de resten van de Haarlemmermeerlijnen. Auteur: Wim Wegman. HDC Media, Alkmaar, 2007. ISBN 978-90-77842-04-1
- Station Haarlem. Hollandsche sporen door Haarlem en omstreken. Uitgeverij Spaar en Hout, Haarlem, 2006. ISBN 978-90-8683-004-6
