= Haarlemmermeer station =

Haarlemmermeerstation
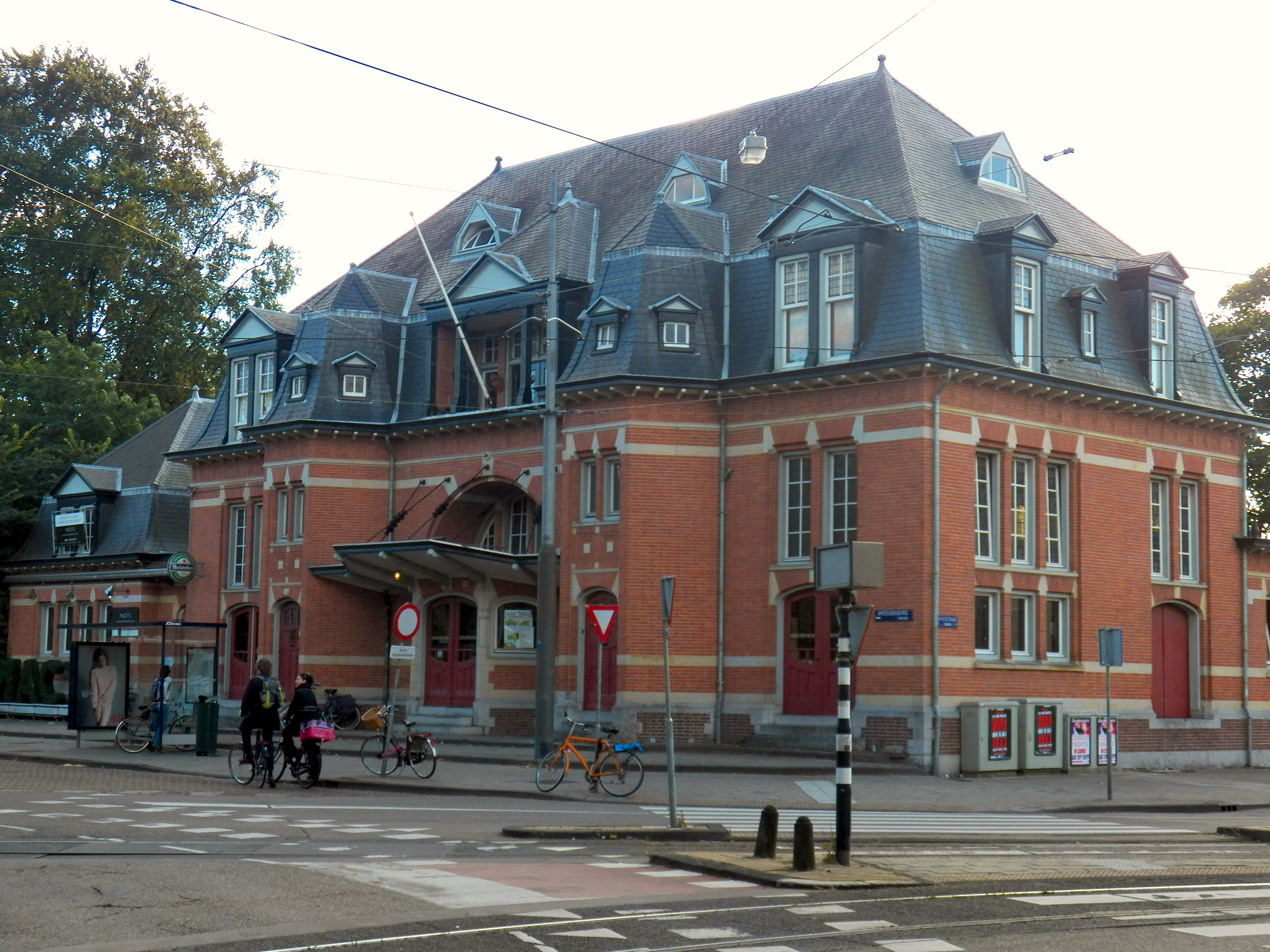

General information
- Location: Stationsstraat 28; Amstelveen; Netherlands
- Coordinates: 52°21′N 4°51′E
- System: Former Nederlandse Spoorwegen station Current shuttle bus stop
- Operator: GVB (currently); Nederlandse Spoorwegen (pre-1950)
- Line: Amsterdam–Aalsmeer line

Other information
- Station code: Ash

History
- Opened: 1 May 1915
- Closed: 3 September 1950
- Rebuilt: 20 September 1975 (for heritage streetcar use)

Services
Preceding station	Amsterdam Tram	Following station
Jollenpad Terminus	Line 30 shuttle bus	Terminus
Former services
Preceding station	Amsterdam Tram	Following station
Valeriusplein towards Centraal Station	Line 16	Stadionplein towards De Boelelaan/VU
Jan Wils Bridge towards Bovenkerk	Line 30	Terminus
Location
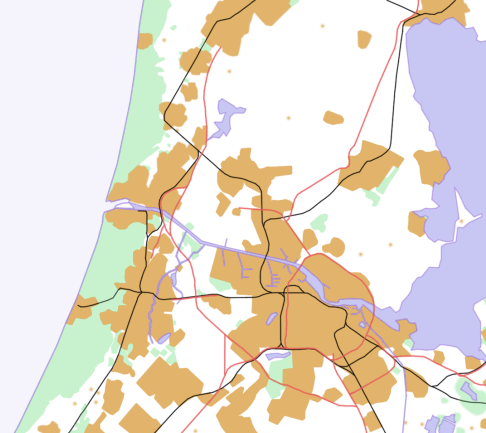
- Location within Northern Randstad Location within Netherlands

The Haarlemmermeer station, called Willemspark Station, was built in 1915 by architect H. van Emmerik, but originally designed by Karel de Bazel. The station is located on the corner of Amstelveenseweg and Havenstraat. Until the arrival of the bus station of Maarse & Kroon, which replaced the train, there was a small park in front of the station.

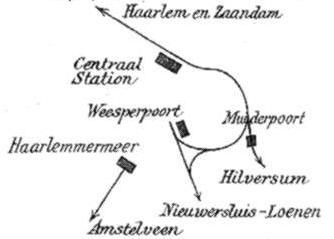
Location of the stations in Amsterdam in 1936

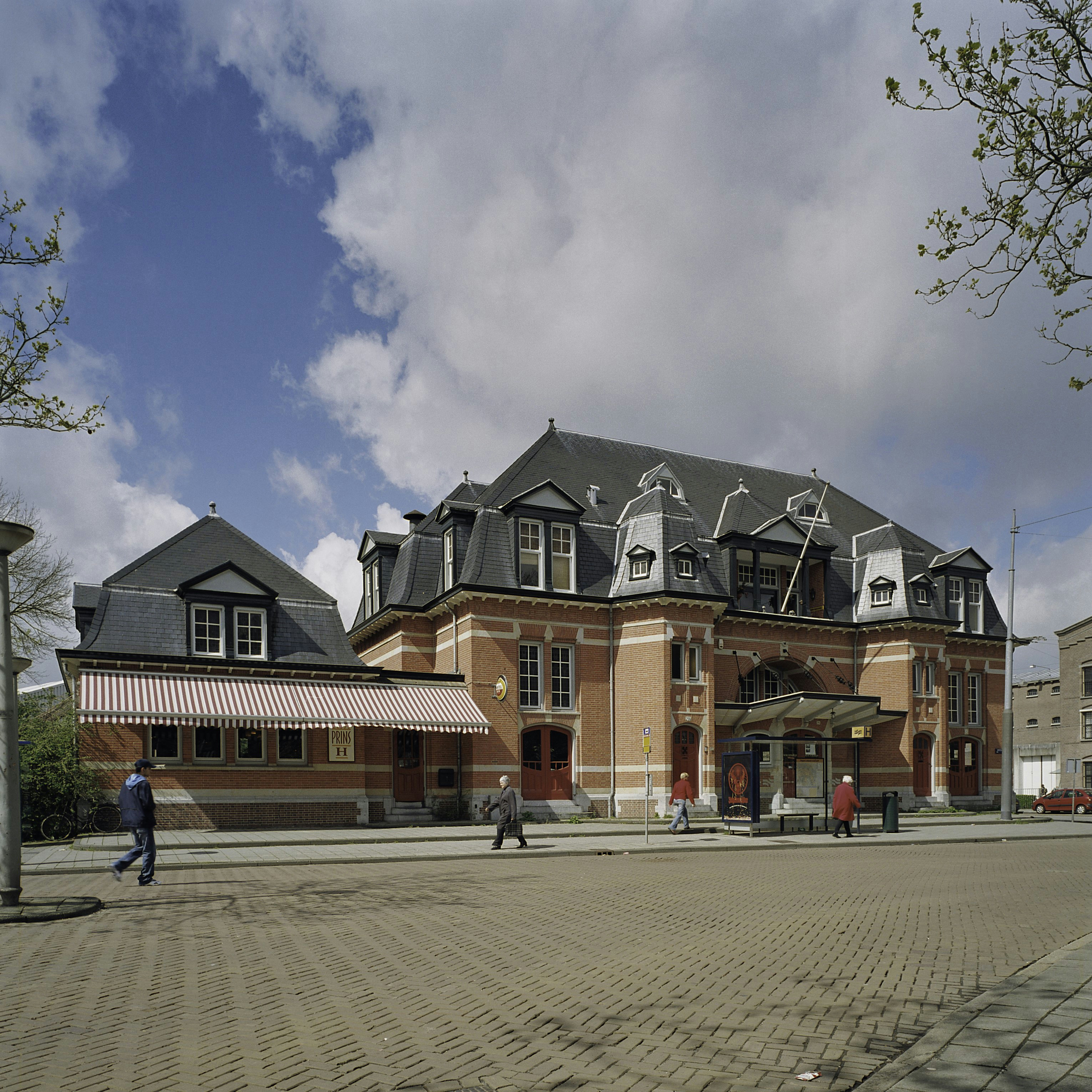
Haarlemmermeer station streetside in June 2005.

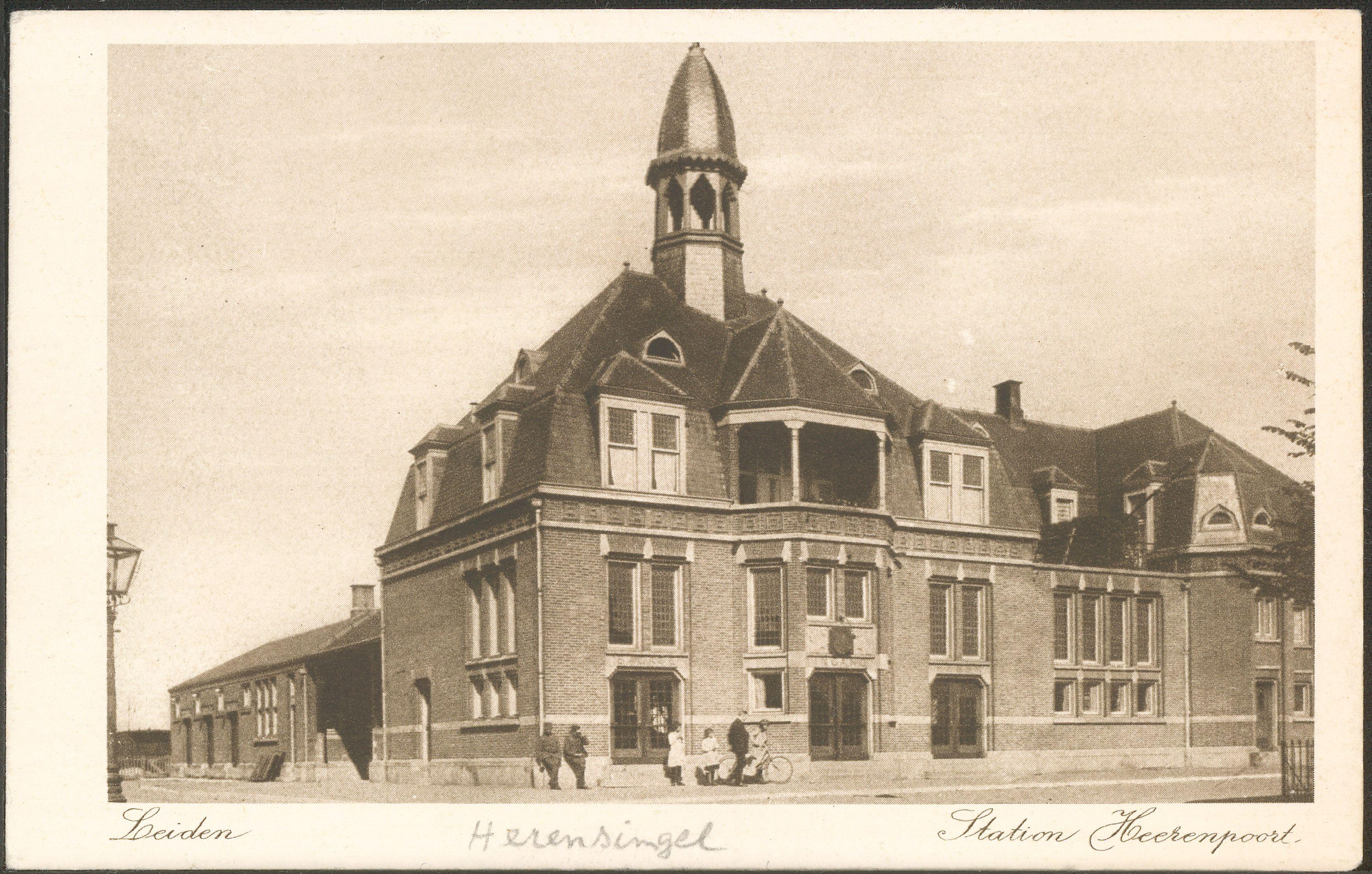
At this photo of Leiden Heerensingel station, the resemblance with Amsterdam Haarlemmermeer station is clearly visible. Postcard (ca.1925; collection archive Leiden).

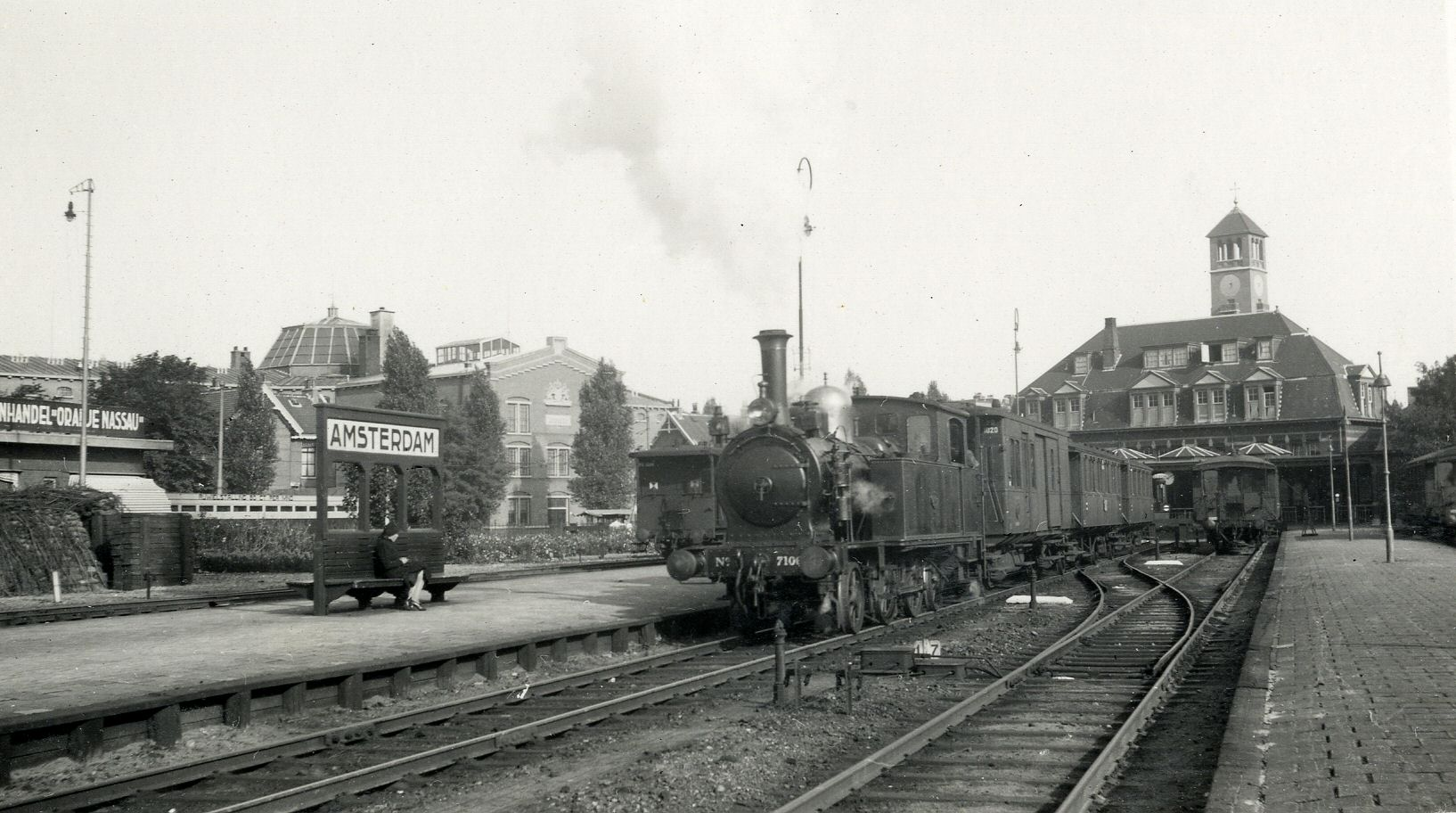
Steam locomotive NS 7106 by train along the platform of Amsterdam Haarlemmermeer station; between 1925 and 1935.

The station is a terminal station, with a symmetrical facade. To the left of the main building is an extension with the former second-class waiting room / station restoration (now cafe). The style is reminiscent of the former Leiden Heerensingel station in many ways. The architect of Leiden Heerensingel (Karel de Bazel) has worked in the design of this station.

The right side wall is on certain parts identical with the left side wall of the building in Leiden, whether or not in mirror image. The forward parts of the facade, to the left and right of the entrance are almost identical to the right part of Leiden.

Above the entrance is a curved awning. Up there is a hemisphere window. The rear facade shows the layout of the floors: the very high roof houses two floors; there are two houses in it.

The building was handed over to the Zuid district by the Nederlandse Spoorwegen in the 1990s and has undergone a refurbishment. The station hall is in use at the museum tram line, the left part is a café and was also used in the 2012/'13 season to record television programs including the media program The Art of the VARA. Behind the station is a terrace.

== Railway lines ==
It was the Amsterdam terminal station on the Amsterdam—Aalsmeer line of the Haarlemmermeer railway lines, and there was also the Koenenkade stop on Amsterdam territory. The building is located on the Amstelveenseweg in Amsterdam-Zuid and is the starting point of the former railway line to Amstelveen – Aalsmeer / Uithoorn.

Passenger traffic was discontinued in 1950, after which the traffic of goods (mainly coal transport) remained until 1972. After the closure, the Haarlemmermeer station and the line to Amstelveen – Bovenkerk came to use from 1975 at the Electrische Museumtramlijn Amsterdam (EMA). During the construction of the Schiphol line, part of the route was again used from 1976 to 1981 for the supply of building materials and trainsets.

== Former emplacement ==
Behind the station building was the railway yard where the trains left for Aalsmeer and Uithoorn. At a southwestern end was a characteristic signal house. This was demolished in 1975. After the end of passenger traffic in 1950, the emplacement was further used for freight traffic. Coal transport was especially important. There were several coal depots. With the advent of natural gas, the importance of coal trade was reduced. After the closure of the railroad for freight service in 1972, the former place developed into a business park, a kind of 'fringe' of the city. From 1975 the Electrische Museumtramlijn Amsterdam (EMA) served it. From the eighties, plans were made for this site, first in 1987 for a tram line and a tunnel under the Schinkel. This plan did not take place. From around 2000, plans were made for housing construction. The planning for this project, the Havenstraatterrein, started in 2017. In 2021, the municipality decided to implement this plan. In 2024 the work started, in which the remains of the former emplacement, the infrastructure and warehouses were cleaned up. In the following years, approximately 500 homes will be built.

== Haarlemmermeer circuit ==
The traffic intersection and the park in front of the station disappeared in 1950 and made way for the bus station of Maarse & Kroon. There was also a roundabout on which the Amstelveenseweg, Cornelis Krusemanstraat, Bernard Kochstraat and Havenstraat will be launched. The roundabout was important to be able to flow better on traffic but also important to allow the many replacement buses of Maarse & Kroon to turn that were set after the ferry from the train in 1950. The tram tracks were also shifted around the circuit. However, for tram 16 city outward, a track through the circuit was laid for tram 16 city, so that the line no longer needed to round the circuit, which saved a lot of time.

== Public transport services ==
From 1923 to 1971 tram line 16 had its final stop in the Havenstraat. There were also a few bus lines. Most of the lines had their stop in front of the station or on the Amstelveenseweg. In 1971, line 16 was given a stop for the station, this line was closed on 22 July 2018. At the bus station, some bus lines have a stop from city: GVB bus lines 15 and 62 and Connexxion bus lines 357 and 397. City inward the buses stop next to the earlier stop of line 16. In 2018, the square in front of the station was reconstructed where the city-tripway was moved from the outside and two bus lanes with stops have appeared between the roadway and the no longer used tram stop. Between the roadway and the bus stops a small green strip appeared again.

== Sources ==
- Het Haarlemmermeerstation op de Beeldbank Amsterdam
- Het station op stationsweb.nl
- Cultuurhistorische verkenning en advies - Gemeente Amsterdam (pdf)
