= Jollenpad =

- Location: Amsterdam-Zuid
- Postal code: 1081 KC
- From: Jachthavenweg

The Jollenpad is a path in Amsterdam-Zuid.

== Path ==
On 10 June 1936, the street was given its name by council decision of the municipality of Amsterdam, an name for a type of sailboat, the jol. Several streets in this area were named after boats. The trail gave access to a marina north of the Amsterdam Forest and south of the Nieuwe Meersluis from the beginning. The Jollenpad initially ran from the Amstelveenseweg on the Amsterdam–Aalsmeer railway line towards the Nieuwe Meer (there where the Jachthavenweg ran).

In the course of time, the situation on the ground has completely changed with the last major change from around 1998, when the Jollenpad was redefined. The street runs with branches on an island with moorings. The trail then starts at the Jachthavenweg, the coastal road of the Nieuwe Meer and runs into the marina area. The Jollenpad is dead, the only access is also the only exit. The Jollenpad is the only road to the Punterspad (named to punt). Also, since the closure of bridge 2199, it is for the time being the only access to the Damloperspad; that path has nothing to do with the Dam tot Damloop, but is named after the ship type draught runner. West of the beginning of the Punterspath, the Jollenpad runs to death on the New Lake, south of Punterspad, the Jollenpad is dead on the Ice Bar.

At the last definition of the Jollenpad, excavation work was also carried out in the area with more water. There was also more buildings, for example behind the grounds of the so far great eye-catcher here, the Watertoren Amstelveenseweg. This is how the peninsula on which the Damloperspad runs was created. By digging water, three bridges had to be built.

The only buildings on the Jollen and Punterspad are buildings that are involved in the marina, such as for water sports associations. The Damloperspad has no buildings.

== Museum Tram Line ==
North of the railway line in the Jollenpad, an emplacement with four tracks was built in 1976 for the construction of the Schiphol line. From 1979 the Electrische Museumtramlijn Amsterdam (EMA) had its final stop here. In 1981 the emplacement was broken up and the museum tram line was given a changeover and was extended from the Jollenpad to the Kalfjeslaan. The stop was later named Zuiderhof, named after the now-received office buildings.

Due to construction, the Jollenpad is currently the temporary northern terminal of the EMA.

Preceding station	Amsterdam Tram	Following station
Koenenkade towards Parklaan	Line 30	Terminus
Koenenkade towards Parklaan	Line 30	IJsbaanpad Suspended temporarily towards Jan Wils Bridge
Terminus	Line 30 shuttle bus	Haarlemmermeer Terminus

== Bridges ==
The three bridges are built in a short period of time:

- bridge 2197 is a fixed bridge, which gives access from the Jachthavenweg to the marina complex and also to the Damloperspad, a side path of the Jollenpad.
- bridge 2198 is a fixed bridge, which gives access to the actual marina area and therefore also to the Punterspad, bridges 2197 and 2198 are of the same type and also of the same builder, Haasnoot Bruggen from Rijnsburg, the balusters have the shape of the standings in braking work.
- bridge 2199 was a small drawbridge that provided the connection with the Jachthavenweg on the north side of the Damloperspad. Due to work for the widening of the Ring Road South (A10), this part of the Marina Road was closed and bridge 2199 was disabled; crossing is no longer possible; the peninsula was put into use by geese. In August 2022, the bridge was temporarily restored (until 2024).
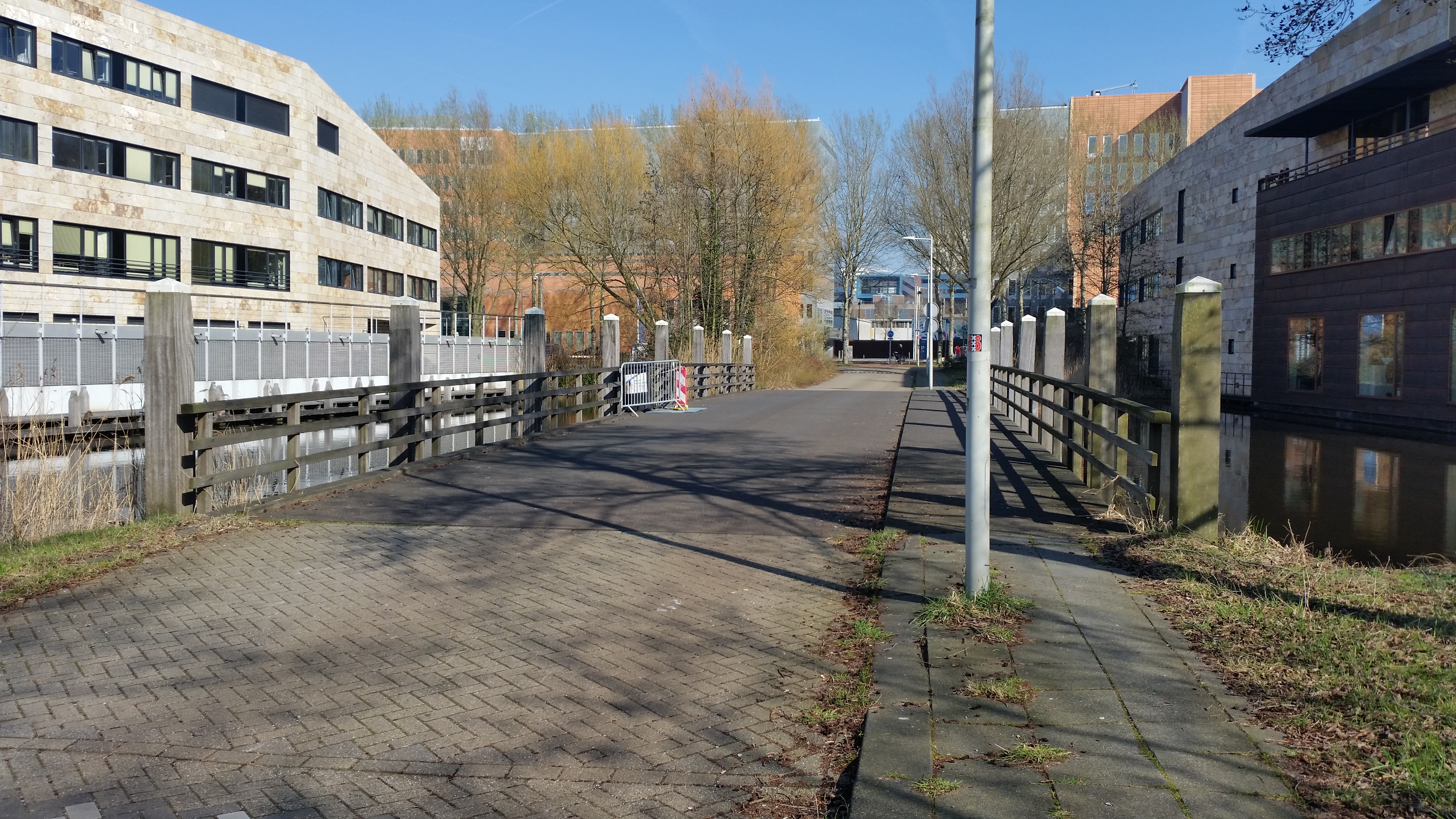
Bridge 2197, direction Jachthavenweg (March 2019)

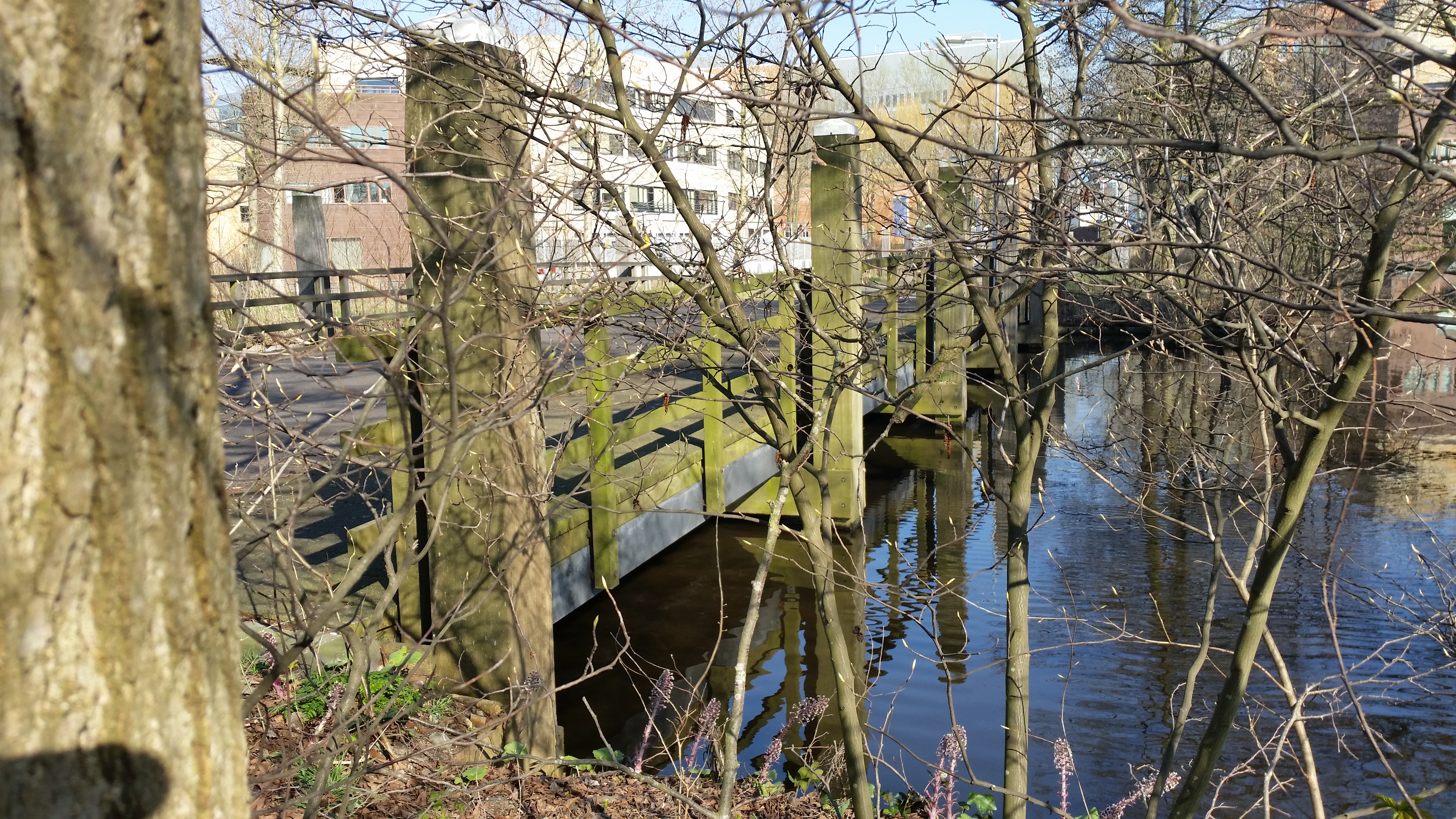
Bridge 2198, direction Damloperspad and Jachthavenweg (March 2019)

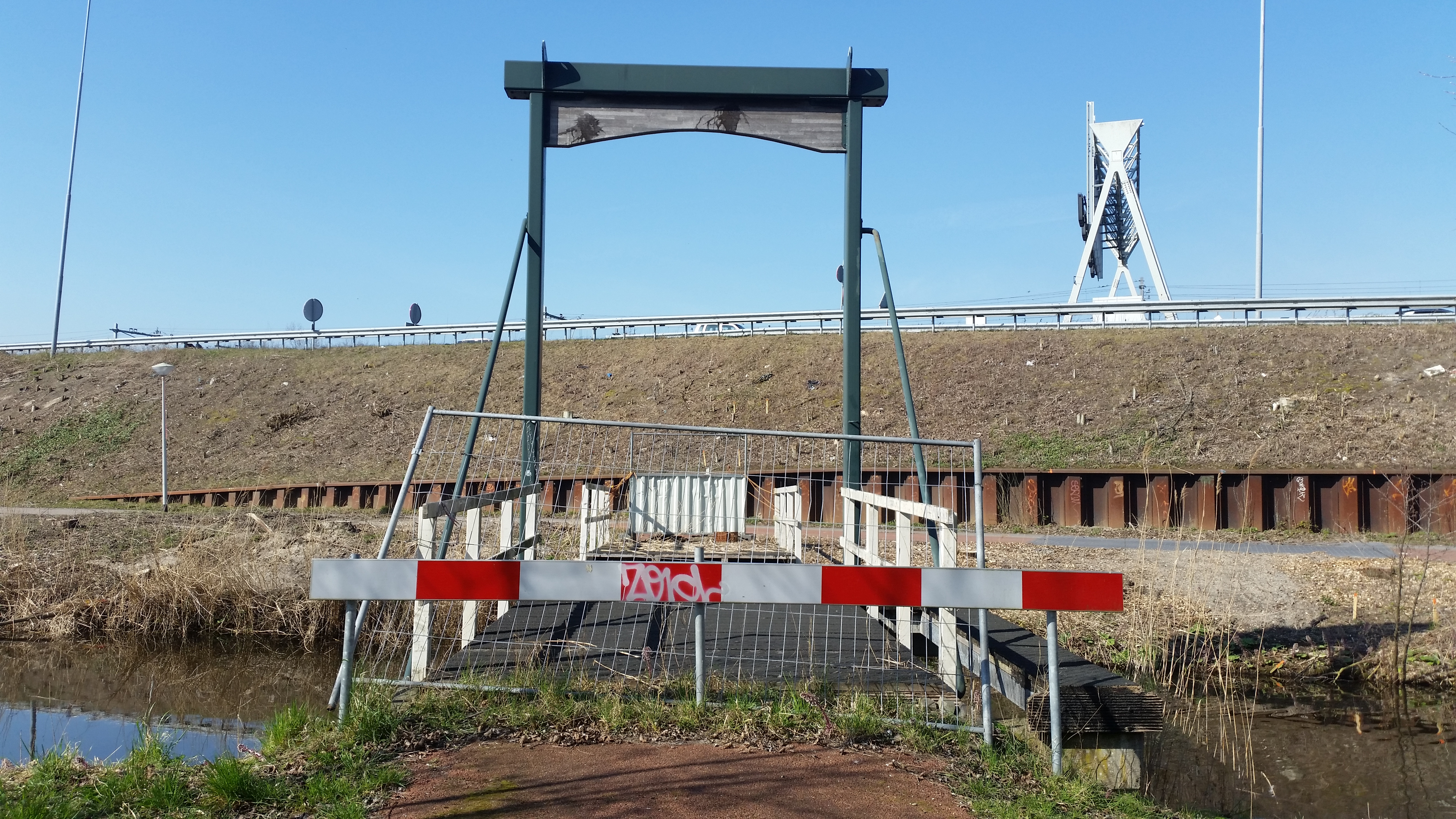
Bridge 2199 (closed), with the Ring Road behind it (A10) (March 2019)
