= Sacharovlaan tram stop =

Tram stop in Amstelveen, Netherlands

Sacharovlaan

General information
- Location: Hammarskjöldsingel at Sacharovlaan, Amstelveen; Netherlands
- Coordinates: 52°16′56.5″N 4°49′57.0″E
- Owner: GVB
- Platforms: 1 centre platform
- Tracks: 2

Other information
- Website: GVB: Sacharovlaan

History
- Opened: 13 September 2004 as metro line 51
- Closed: 3 March 2019
- Rebuilt: 13 December 2020 for tram line 25

Services
Preceding station	Amsterdam Tram	Following station
Poortwachter towards Station Zuid	Line 25	Westwijk towards Uithoorn Centrum

Former services
Preceding station	Amsterdam Metro	Following station
Spinnerij towards Centraal Station	Line 51	Westwijk Terminus
Location

Sacharovlaan is a tram stop within the city of Amstelveen, Netherlands. The stop lies along tram line 25, which was dubbed the Amsteltram before it received its line number. It opened officially on 13 December 2020, unofficially 4 days earlier on 9 December. The tram stop serves the Legmeer business district.

Sacharovlaan was earlier a stop for metro line 51, a hybrid metro/sneltram (light rail) service, that opened to Sacharovlaan and Westwijk in 2004. Like a metro, the sneltram used high-level platforms. Metro service south of Amsterdam Zuid station was closed in 2019 to lower platforms to accommodate the new low-floor trams for line 25.

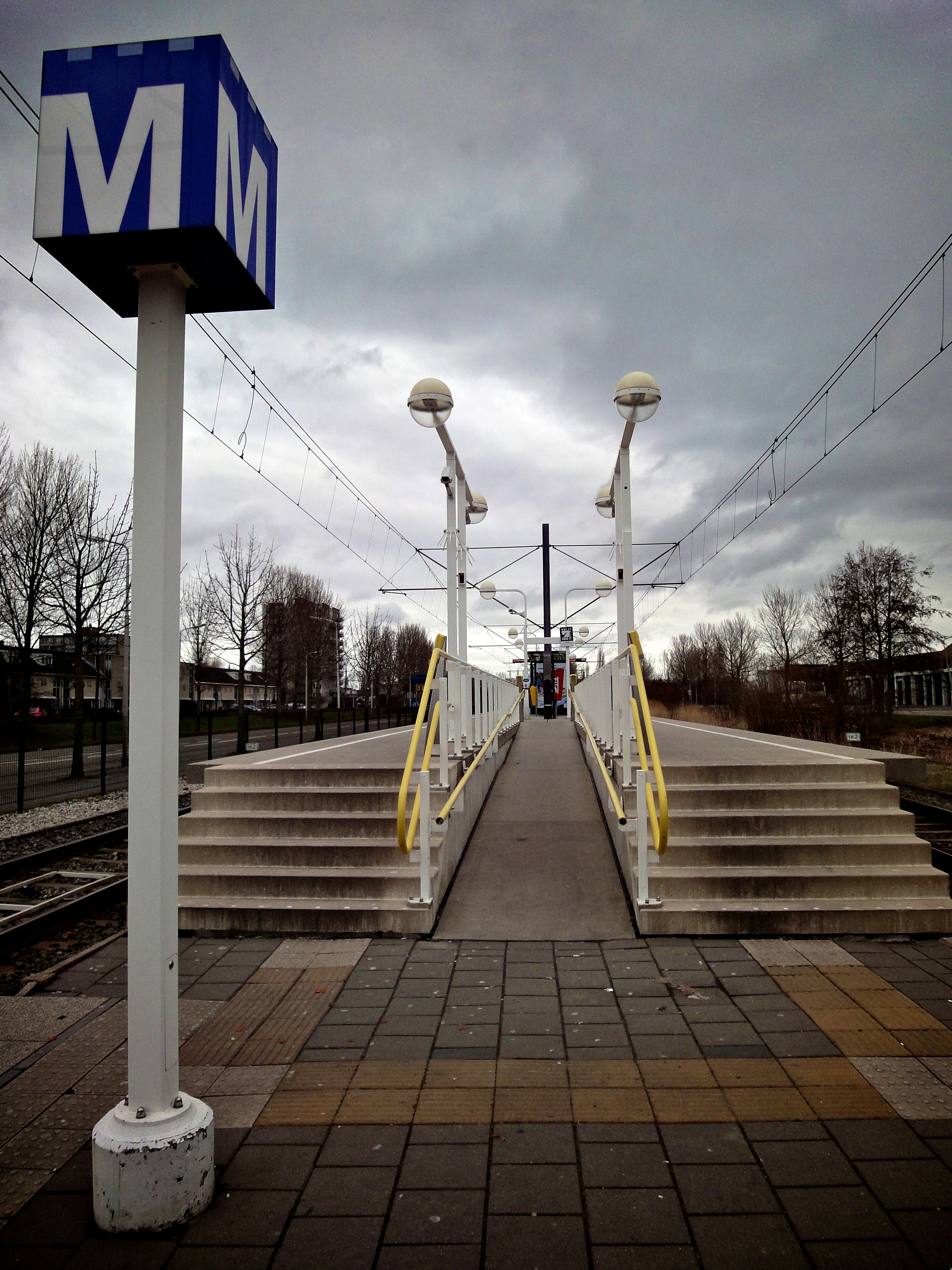
Metro stop Sacharovlaan before rebuilding as a tram stop
