= Spinnerij tram stop =

Tram stop in Amstelveen, Netherlands

Spinnerij

General information
- Location: Spinnerij, Amstelveen; Netherlands
- Coordinates: 52°17′3.2″N 4°50′17.5″E

History
- Opened: 13 Sept 2004 as metro line 51
- Closed: 3 March 2019

Former services
Preceding station	Amsterdam Metro	Following station
Poortwachter towards Centraal Station	Line 51	Sacharovlaan towards Westwijk
Location

Spinnerij was a metro station in Amstelveen on metro line 51, a hybrid metro/sneltram (light rail) route that used high-floor trams. The station closed on 3 March 2019 and was subsequently demolished. After closure, the metro line south of Amsterdam Zuid station, also known as the Amstelveenlijn, was converted for low-floor trams. Today, there is no tram stop at the site. Since its opening on 9 December 2020, the trams of line 25 have been bypassing the site without stopping.

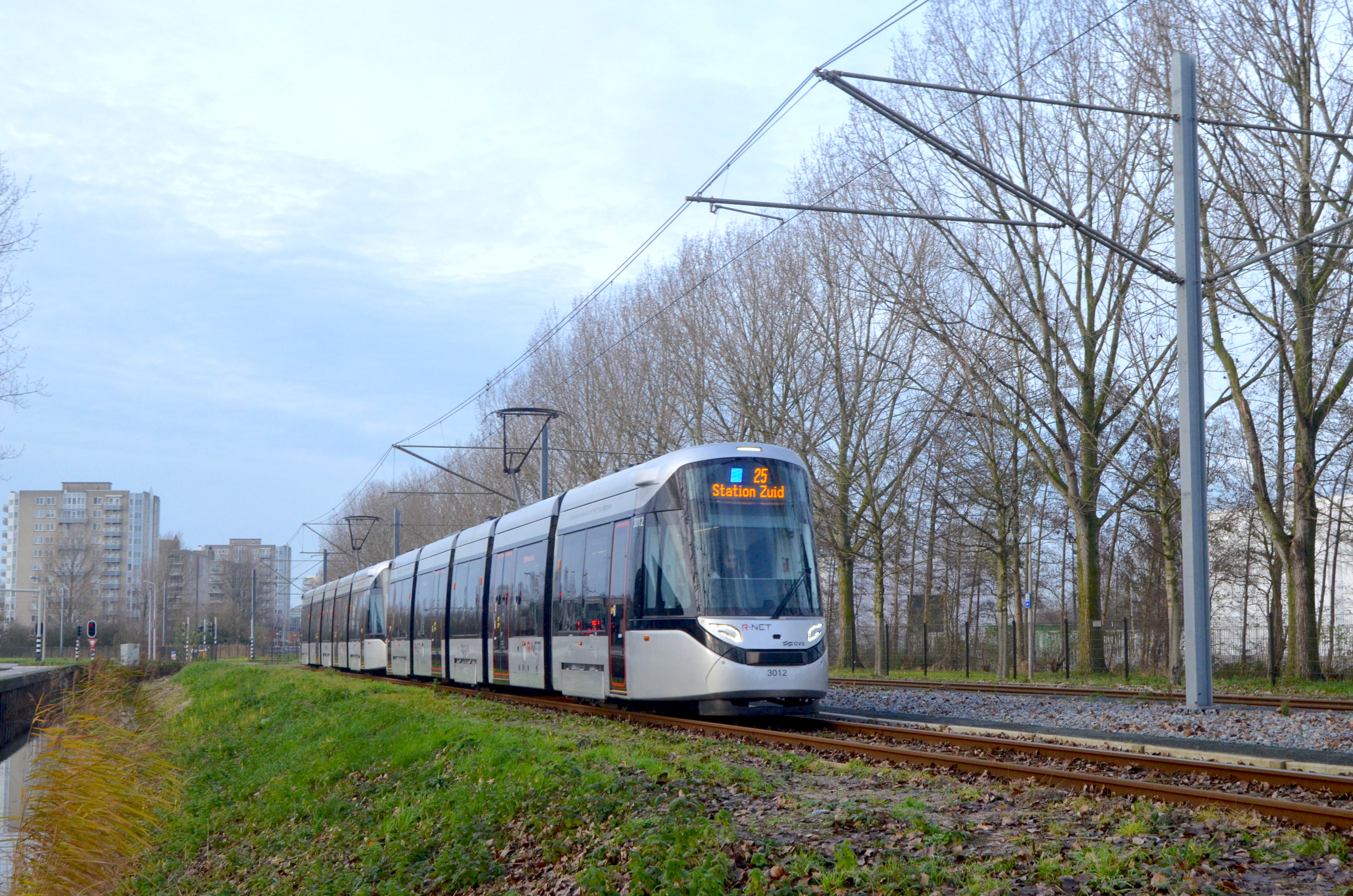
Line 25 coupled trams passing the former Spinnerij site

In order to increase reliability and reduce travel time on the rebuilt line, five line 51 stations, including Spinnerij, were demolished instead of being rebuilt as stops for low-floor trams. The former metro station used to serve the Legmeer business district and the nearby Canon Europa NV facility. The former station site is 400 metres (1,300 ft) from the Poortwachter tram stop. Legmeer is also served by the Sacharovlaan tram stop.
