= Poortwachter tram stop =

Tram stop in Amstelveen, Netherlands

Poortwachter

General information
- Location: Poortwachter, Amstelveen; Netherlands
- Coordinates: 52°16′59.7″N 4°50′43.6″E
- Platforms: 1 centre platform
- Tracks: 2

Other information
- Website: GVB: Poortwachter

History
- Opened: 2 Dec 1990 for metro line 51
- Closed: 3 March 2019
- Rebuilt: 13 December 2020 for tram line 25 Tram line 25 (Amsteltram)

Services
Preceding station	Amsterdam Tram	Following station
Brink towards Station Zuid	Line 25	Sacharovlaan towards Uithoorn Centrum

Former services
Preceding station	Amsterdam Metro	Following station
Brink towards Centraal Station	Line 51	Spinnerij towards Westwijk
Location

Poortwachter is a tram stop within the city of Amstelveen, Netherlands. The stop lies along tram line 25, which was dubbed the Amsteltram before it received its line number. It opened officially on 13 December 2020, unofficially 4 days earlier on 9 December.

Poortwachter was earlier a stop for metro line 51, a hybrid metro/sneltram (light rail) service, and was the southern terminal of that line before it was extended to Westwijk in 2004. Like a metro, the sneltram used high-level platforms. Metro line 51 service south of Amsterdam Zuid station was closed in 2019 to rebuild stations for lower platforms in order to accommodate the new low-floor trams for line 25.

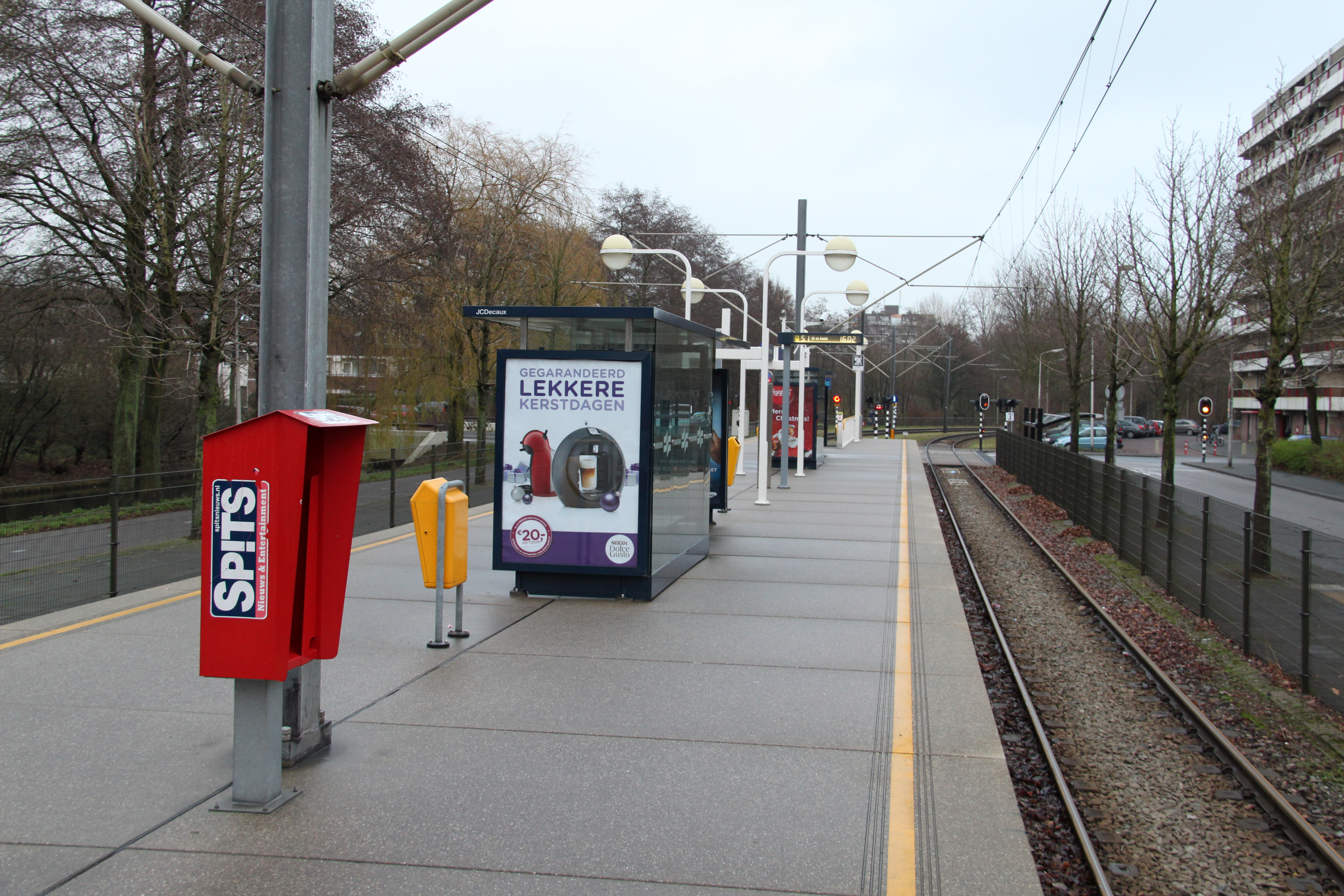
Metro stop Poortwachter before rebuilding as a tram stop
