= Jan Wils Bridge =

Jan Wils Bridge Jan Wilsbrug
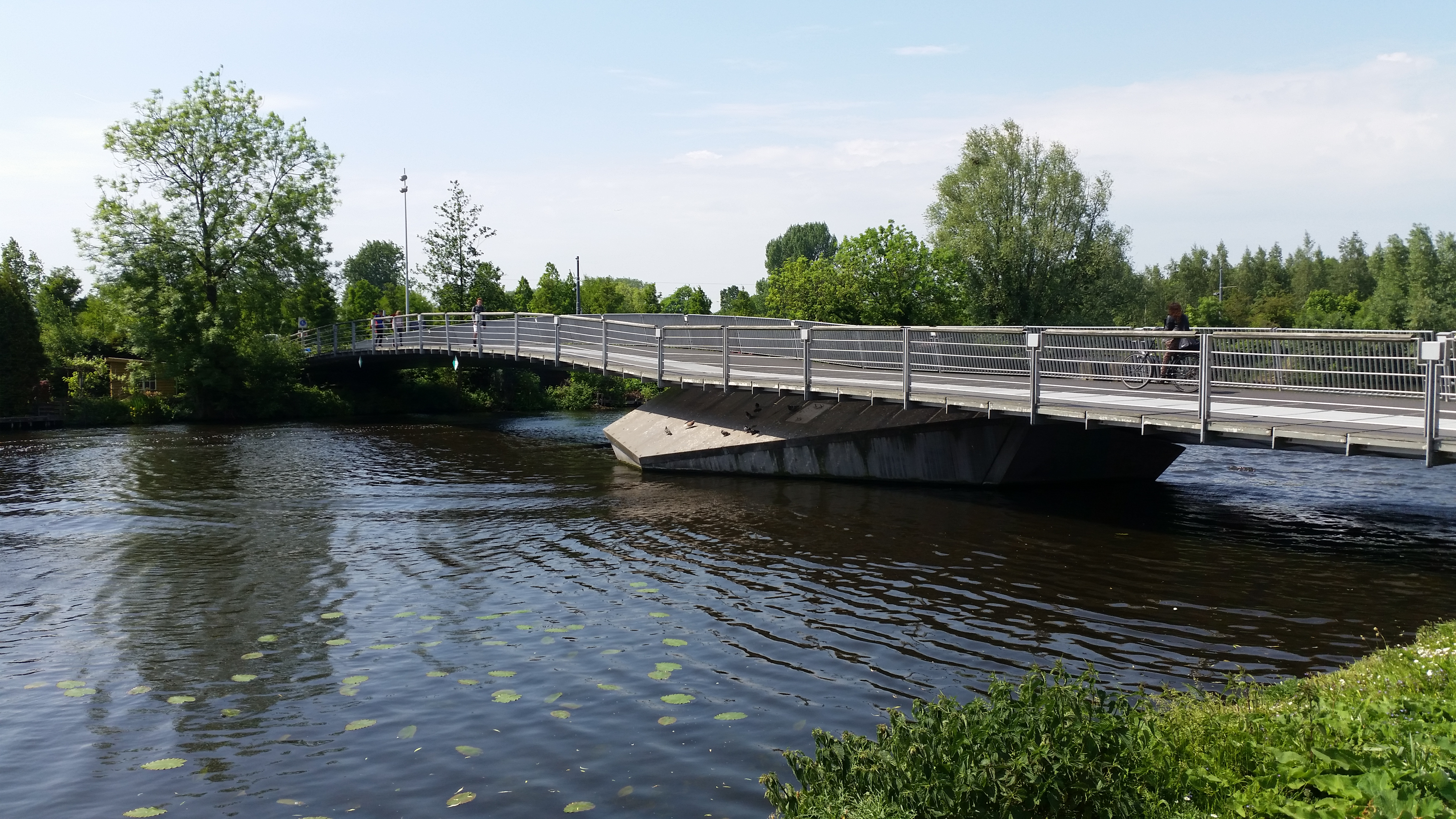
- Jan Wils Bridge in 2018
- Coordinates: 52°20′40″N 4°51′04″E
- Carries: Pedestrians and cyclists
- Crosses: Stadiongracht
- Locale: Amsterdam-Zuid

Characteristics
- Material: Steel
- Diameter: 75 meters

History
- Architect: Rob Lubrecht
- Built: 2007-2008
- Opened: 4 October 2008

The Jan Wils Bridge is a permanent bridge for pedestrians and cyclists in Amsterdam-Zuid.

The bridge spans the Stadiongracht which forms the connection between the Noorder and Zuider Amstelkanaal. It is an extension of the Laan der Hesperides and leads to the Piet Kranenburgpad, along which the Electrische Museumtramlijn Amsterdam also runs. To the west of the bridge are a number of islands, which form the Park Schinkel Islands.

The design was designed by architect Rob Lubrecht in 2003. The bridge was built in Vlissingen in 2007/2008 and transported by Wagenborg Nedlift to its place by ship/pontoons. Heavy Demag mobile cranes had to be used to get the bridge on moving structures and then hoist them on the pontoons behind/for a tugboat. The pontoons were equipped with rotary castles to maneuver better through the Amsterdam canals. The bridge was sailed in length through the Olympia Canal (Channel between the Schinkel and the Stadiongracht). To make that possible, bridge 1634 had to be removed from its place. Once in the Stadiongracht, the bridge was transported in its length to the headlands and then turned 90 degrees. When the bridge was between the heads of the land the pontoons were dropped and thus the bridge also abducted until it lay on the heads of the country and a central pillar.

The span is carried by a steel tube on which the bike path is located. The footpath hangs there on the side, as it were. Striking about the burg is that it is for the eastern part and has an arch construction near the western part. The bridge is named after architect Jan Wils who provided the design of the nearby Olympic Stadium and the two buildings in Amsterdam famous for Citroën on Stadionplein.

== Tram station ==
The Jan Wils Bridge is home to an Electrische Museumtramlijn Amsterdam station. However, it is temporarily out of use, as is the rest of the line north of Jollenpad.

Preceding station	Amsterdam Tram	Following station
IJsbaanpad towards Bovenkerk	Line 30 Temporarily suspended	Terminus
IJsbaanpad towards Bovenkerk	Line 30 Temporarily suspended	Haarlemmermeer Closed 2021 Terminus
