= Bovenkerk, Amstelveen =

Bovenkerk
- Village
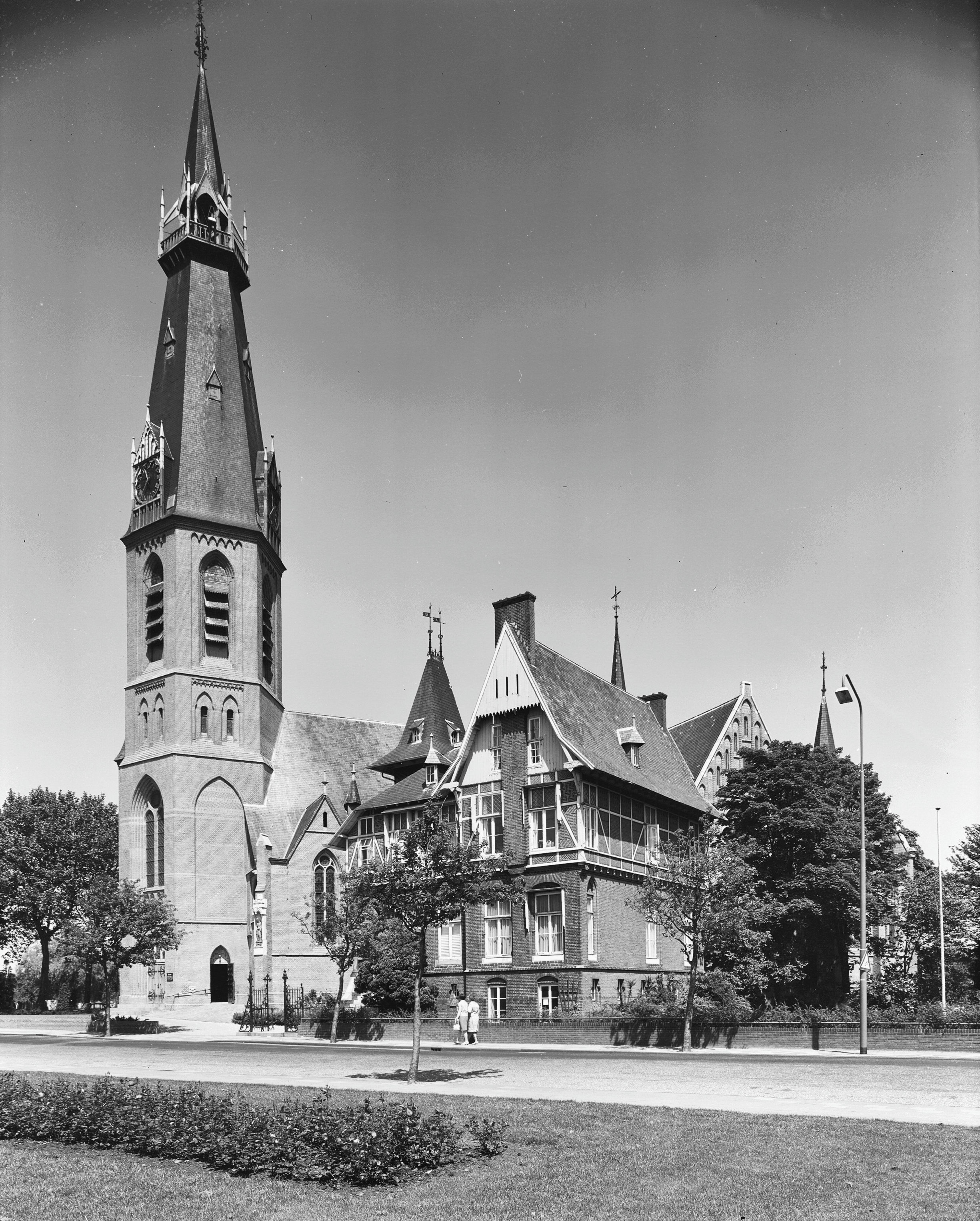
- Saint Urbanus Church in Bovenkerk

- Location in the Netherlands Location in the province of North Holland in the Netherlands
- Coordinates: 52°17.5′N 4°51′E
- Country: Netherlands
- Province: North Holland
- Municipality: Amstelveen

Population (1 January 2016)
  - Total: 3,040
- Time zone: UTC+1 (CET)
  - Summer (DST): UTC+2 (CEST)
- Postal code: 1185, 1187
- Dialing code: 020

Bovenkerk is a village in the municipality of Amstelveen in the province of North Holland, Netherlands. Bovenkerk was part of the municipality of Nieuwer-Amstel until 1964, when it was absorbed in the newly-formed municipality of Amstelveen. It lies on the western side of Amstelveen and next to the Amsterdam Forest.

== Population ==
The statistical area of Bovenkerk, which also can include the surrounding countryside, has a population of 3040.

== Sports ==
The Boro Formula One Team, founded by the brothers Bob and Rody Hoogenboom was based in Bovenkerk in 1976 and 1977.
