= Westwijk tram stop =

Tram station in Amstelveen, Netherlands

Westwijk
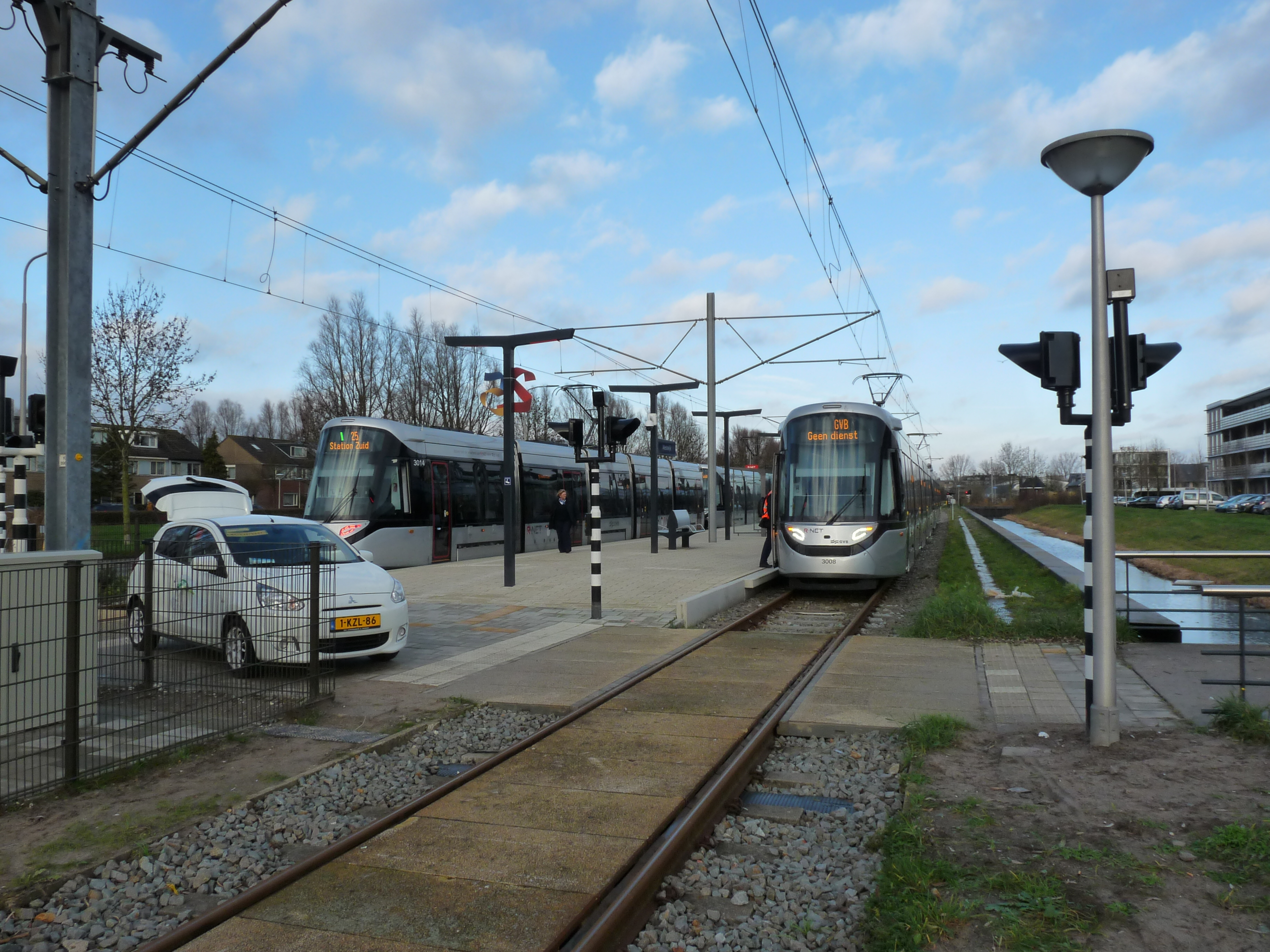
- Low-floor trams at Westwijk

General information
- Location: Westwijk, Amstelveen; Netherlands
- Coordinates: 52°16′28″N 4°49′50″E
- Owner: GVB
- Platforms: 1 centre platform
- Tracks: 2

Other information
- Website: GVB: Westwijk

History
- Opened: 13 Sept 2004 as metro line 51
- Closed: 3 March 2019
- Rebuilt: 13 December 2020 for tram line 25

Services
Preceding station	Amsterdam Tram	Following station
Sacharovlaan towards Station Zuid	Line 25	Aan de Zoom towards Uithoorn Centrum

Former services
Preceding station	Amsterdam Metro	Following station
Sacharovlaan towards Centraal Station	Line 51	Terminus
Location

Westwijk is a tram stop serving the neighborhood of Westwijk in the city of Amstelveen, Netherlands. It serves tram line 25, dubbed the Amsteltram, which opened officially on 13 December 2020, unofficially 4 days earlier on 9 December. It used to be the southern terminus of the line until the opening of the extension to Uithoorn Centrum on 21 July 2024.

== History ==
Westwijk was earlier the former terminus of metro line 51, a hybrid metro/sneltram (light rail) service, that opened to Westwijk in 2004. Like a metro, the sneltram used high-level platforms. Metro service south of Amsterdam Zuid station was closed in 2019 to lower platforms to accommodate the new low-floor trams for line 25.

When the 2004 extension of metro line 51 was built, it used 1.5 kilometres (0.93 mi) of the roadbed of the scrapped Bovenkerk – Uithoorn railway line, one of the former Haarlemmermeer railway lines. The section of the line on which the Westwijk and Sacharovlaan stops sit was opened in 1915 and was in use as a railway line until 1950. The Haarlemmermeer railway's Legmeerpolder station was just south of the Westwijk stop at J.C. van Hattumweg. Today the dwelling for the station's level crossing guard (baanwachter) exists today on the east side of the tram tracks, north of J.C. van Hattumweg.

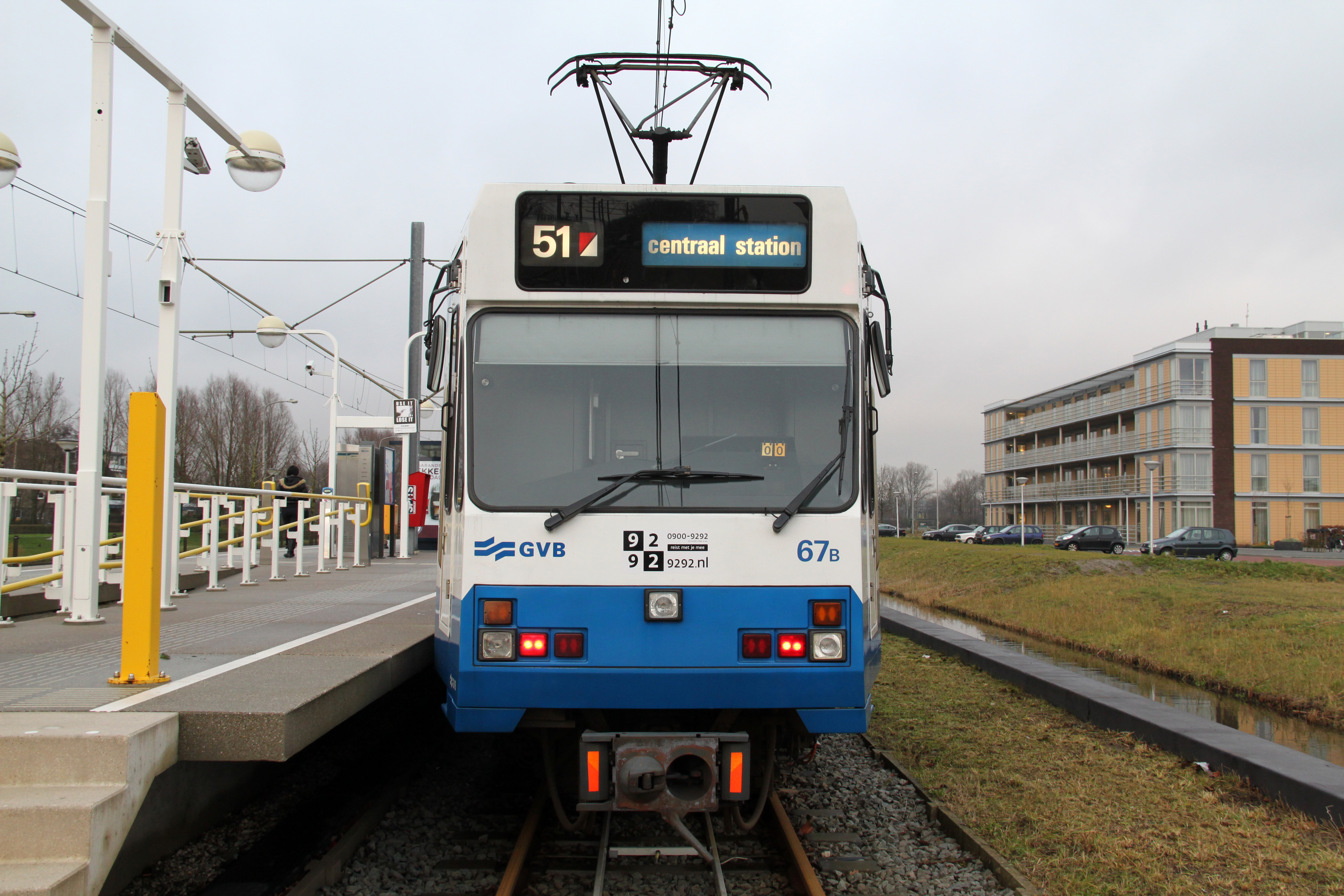
Metro line 51 sneltram (light rail tram) at Westwijk in 2011
