= Municipal monument in the Netherlands =

Municipal historical preservation in The Netherlands

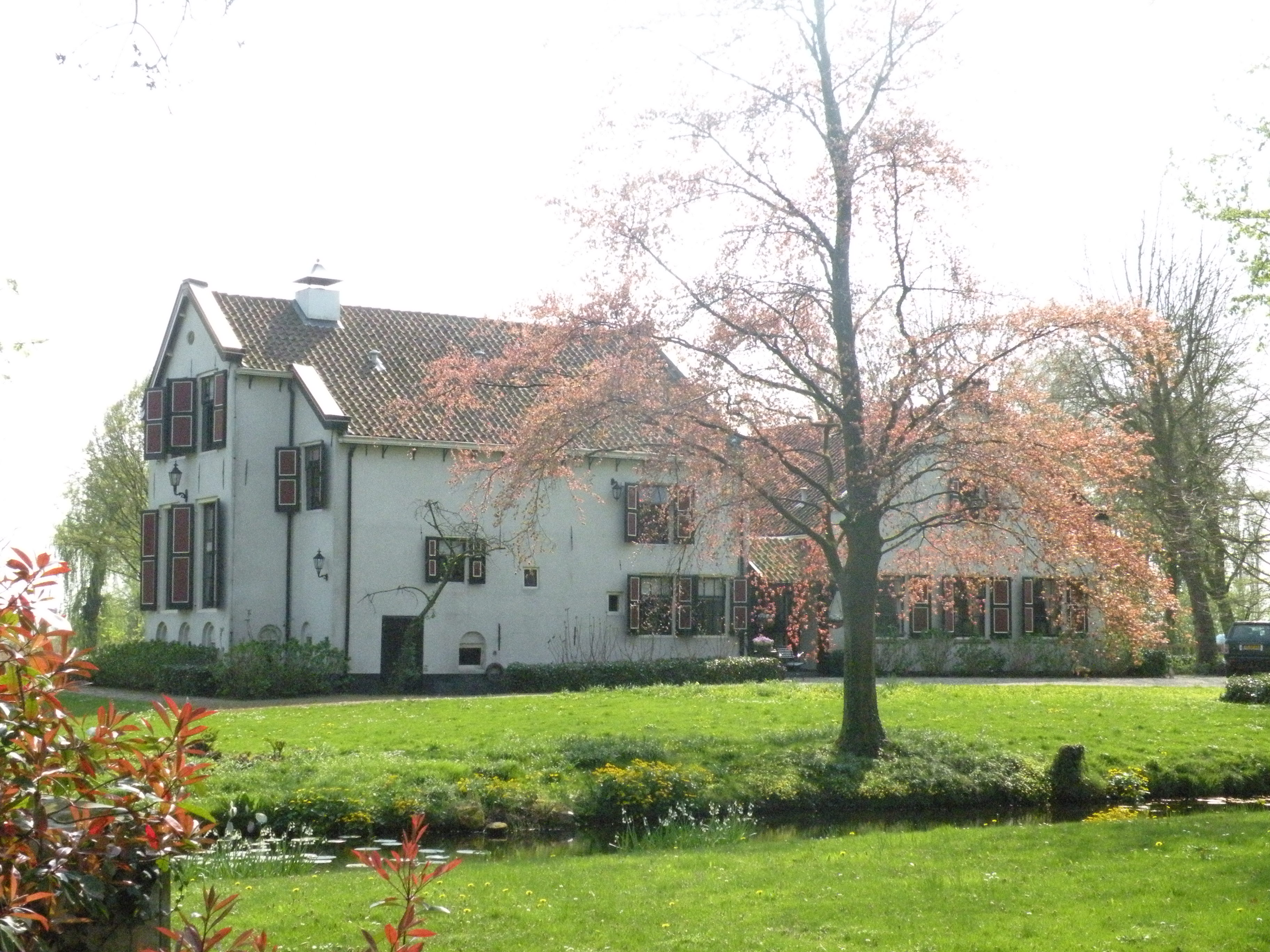
"Het Land van Belofte", a "hofstede" in Moerkapelle, Zuidplas

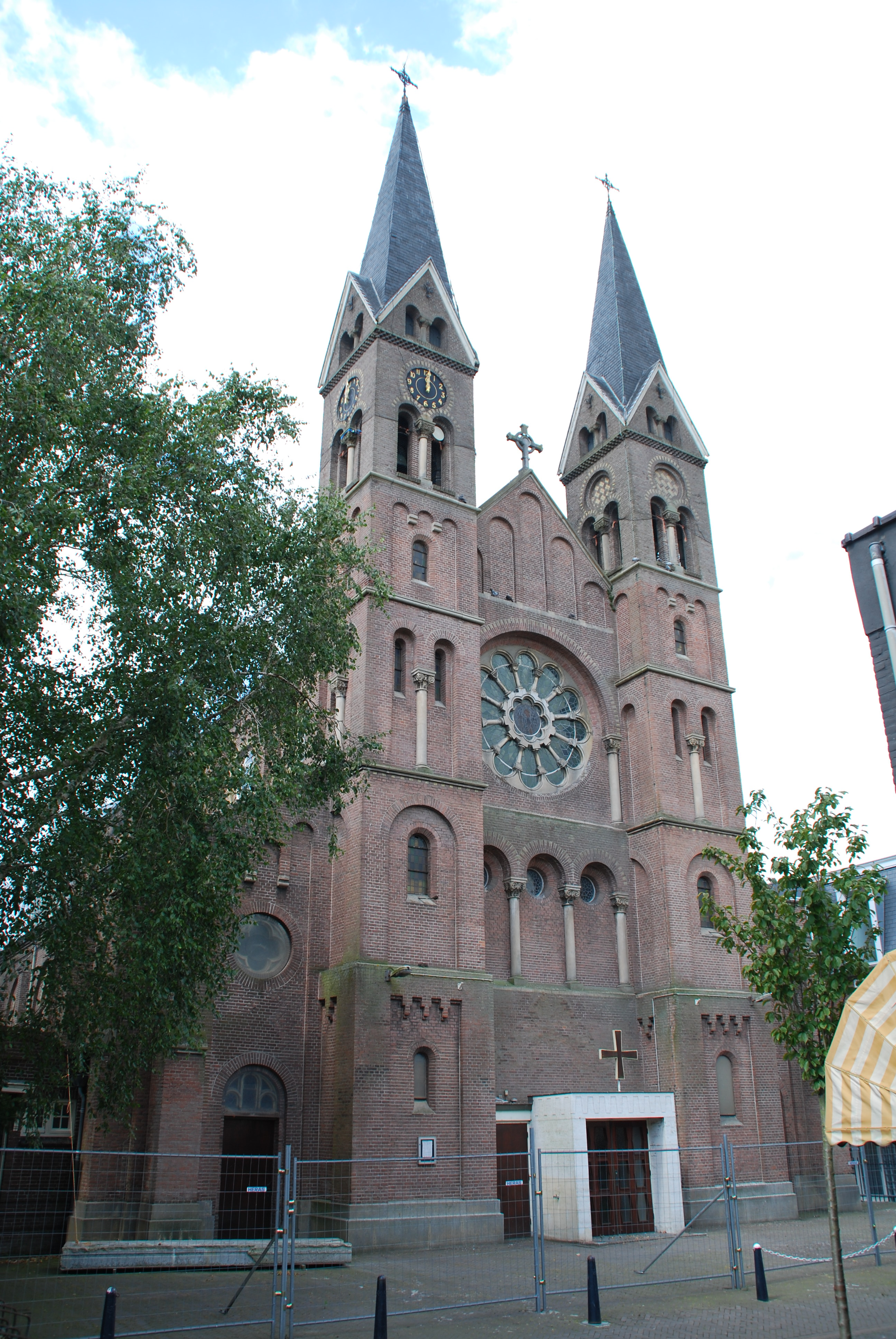
The Schanskerk in Uithoorn, which, through municipal interference, can not be demolished

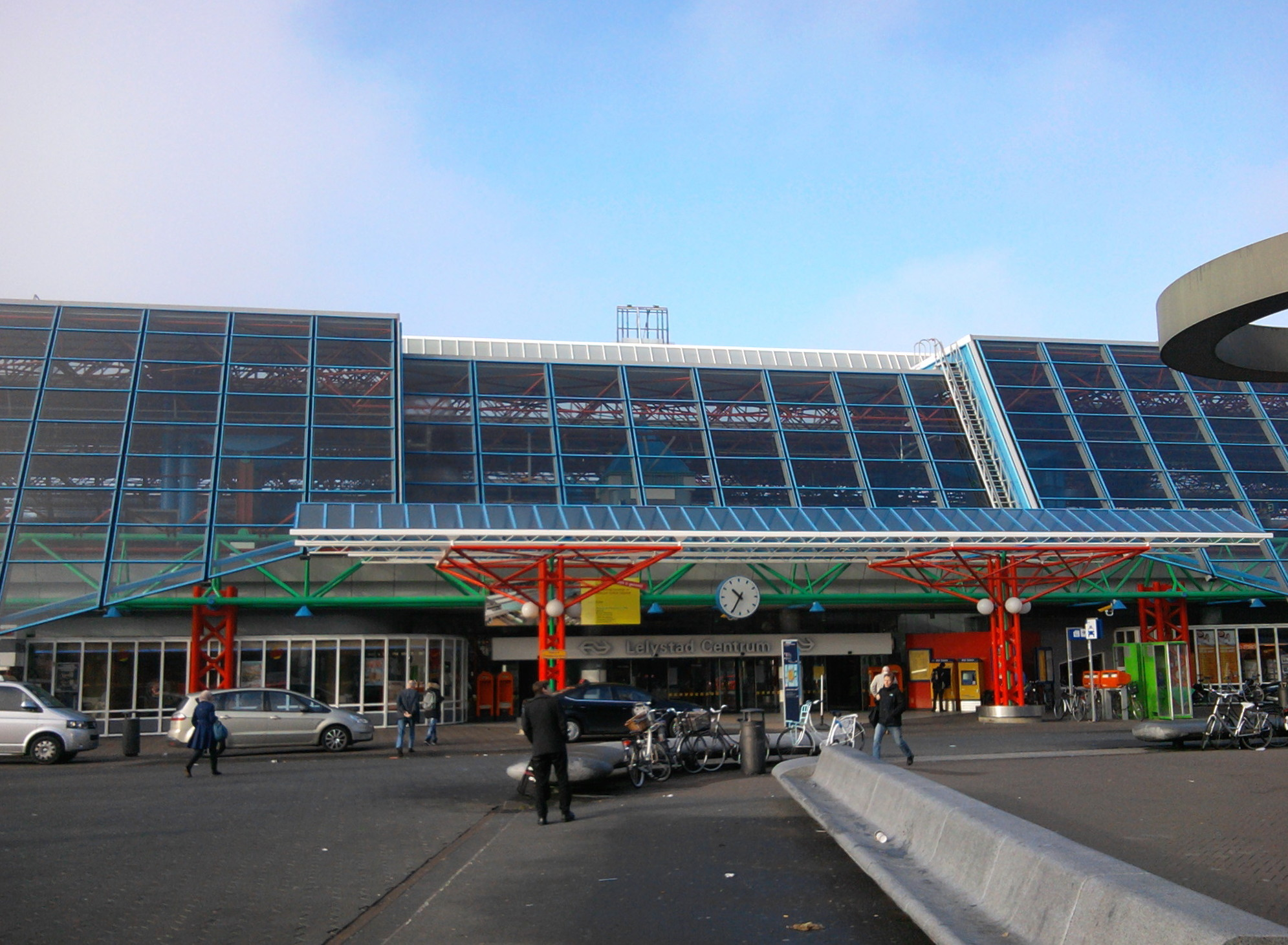
Station Lelystad Centrum, a very young monument

A municipal monument in The Netherlands is a construction, archeological site or landscape structure which, on the basis of the respective municipal monument ordinance, enjoys protection due to its exception cultural, historical or architectural value. It is up to the municipality to designate a municipal monument. Because of this, it can occur that a municipality doesn't have a single municipal monument.

If the municipal monument ordinance is based on the Erfgoedwet(Cultural inheritance law), only real estate can be designated as monuments. Registered property can also be appointed as monuments if municipality base their ordinance on different laws.

Objects with a municipal monument satus are often of local and regional importance, while objects who are registered as a rijksmonument are often of national or international interest. In 2010, The Netherlands had about 41.000 addresses appointed as municipal monuments.

== Monument crests ==
Different municipalities have designed a crest for their municipal monuments, the following is a selection:

Monument crest of the municipality Westland

Monument crest of the municipality Culemborg

Monument crest of the municipality Houten

Monument crest of the municipality Wageningen

Monument crest of the municipality Oldebroek

Monument crest of the municipality Haarlem

Monument crest of the municipality Ede

Monument crest of municipality Hoorn, the first in the Netherlands that is equal to the rijksmonument crest, maar met wapen van de gemeente

Monument crest of the municipality Sittard-Geleen

== Lists of municipal monuments per province ==
These lists contain a subdivision of municipal monuments per municipality in the designated province. Do note that not every municipality has municipal monuments.

- Drenthe
- Flevoland
- Friesland
- Gelderland

- Groningen
- Limburg
- North Brabant
- North Holland

- Overijssel
- Utrecht
- Zeeland
- South Holland

== See also ==
- Iconic building
- Cultural property
- Provincial monument
- Rijksmonument
- Historic preservation
