= Rottum =

Rottum may refer to any of the following places:

- Rottum (island group), a small group of islands in the Netherlands, part of the West Frisian Islands
- Rottumeroog, a West Frisian island formerly called Rottum
- Rottum, Groningen, a village in province of Groningen, in the Netherlands
- Rottum, Friesland, a village in the province of Friesland, in the Netherlands
- Steinhausen an der Rottum, a village in Germany, in the district Biberach, part of the Steinhausen municipality
- Rottum (river), a river of Baden-Württemberg, Germany, running through the city of Laupheim
