= Monnikenlangenoog =

Island in the Netherlands

Coordinates: 53.5412°N 6.5334°E

- Interactive map of Monnikenlangenoog

Geography
- Archipelago: (West) Frisian Islands
- Adjacent to: North Sea, Wadden Sea
- Length: 15 km (9.3 mi)

Administration
- Netherlands

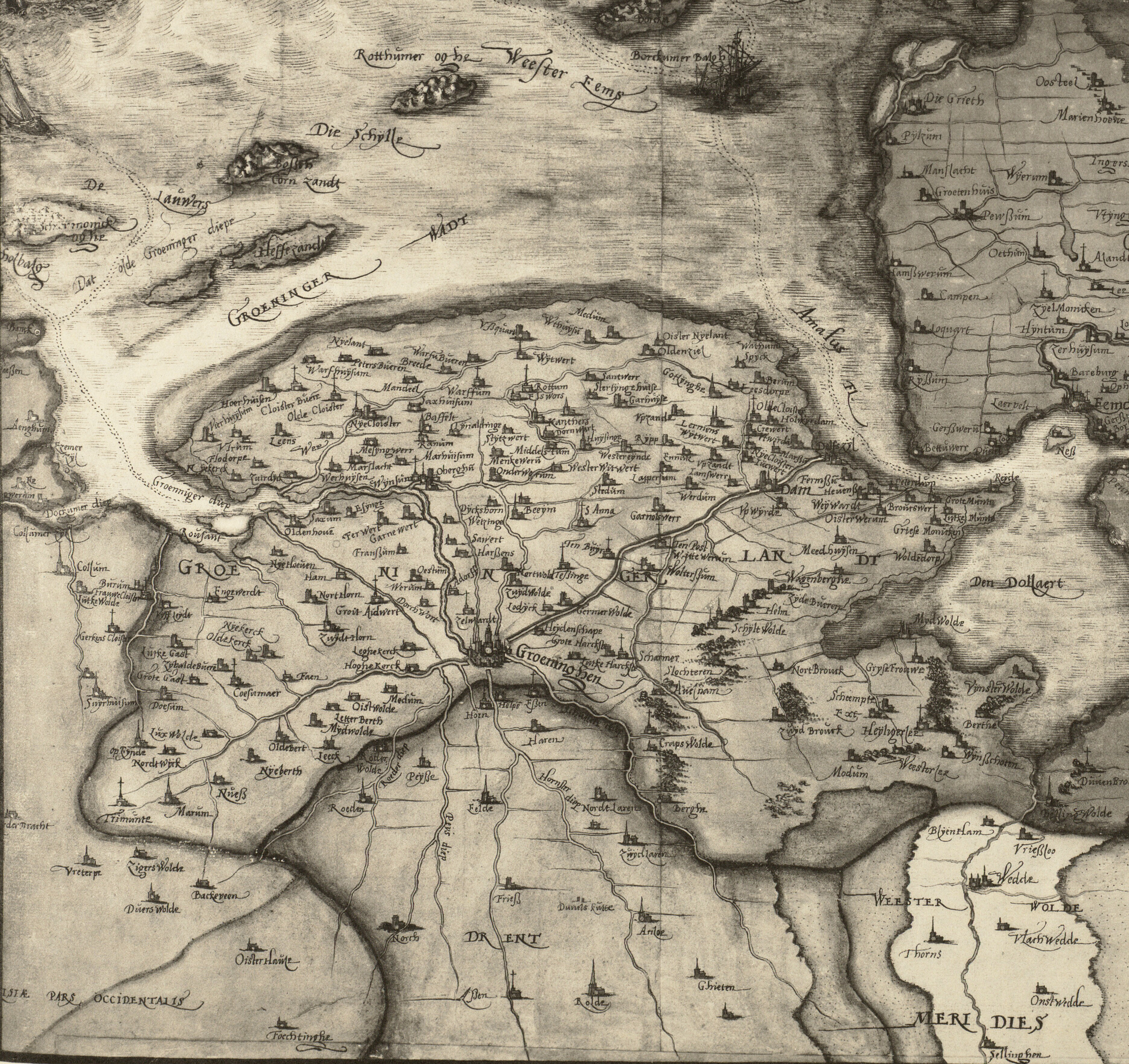
16th-century map of Groningen with the islands of Bosch and Rottumeroog at the location of Monnikenlangenoog

Monnikenlangenoog (Dutch pronunciation: [ˌmɔnɪkə(n)ˈlɑŋənˌoːx, -ŋəˌʔoːx]; English: "Monks' Long Island"), also called Moenkelangenoe, was a West Frisian island in the Wadden Sea. It was situated off the coast of present-day Groningen in the Netherlands, between the islands of Schiermonnikoog and Borkum.

Monnikenlangenoog was 12 to 14 or 15 km long. During summers, the island was used for animal farming, which was of economic importance. In the 14th century, the island was the property of the St. Juliana's Abbey in Rottum and the Old Abbey in Kloosterburen, both on the mainland.

Between 1400 and 1570 CE, Monnikenlangenoog was split into the islands Rottumeroog and Bosch. Rottumeroog remains today, but Bosch has disappeared.
