= Cetacean strandings in Tasmania =

Cetacean strandings in Tasmania occur for a number of reasons, with Tasmania considered a "'hotspot" for the event. Between 1825 and 1986, 213 stranding events had been recorded, involving 22 species, and over 3000 individuals.

== Causes ==
Cetacean strandings may occur for a number of reasons. These include natural causes, such as coastal topography and tidal patterns, searching for food, or a change in electromagnetic fields that could disorient them. Other causes include boat strikes, fishing. and pollution, that could result in injuries and stranding. Pilot whales in particular, living in strong social units, sometimes strand themselves to be with family.

== Stranding events ==
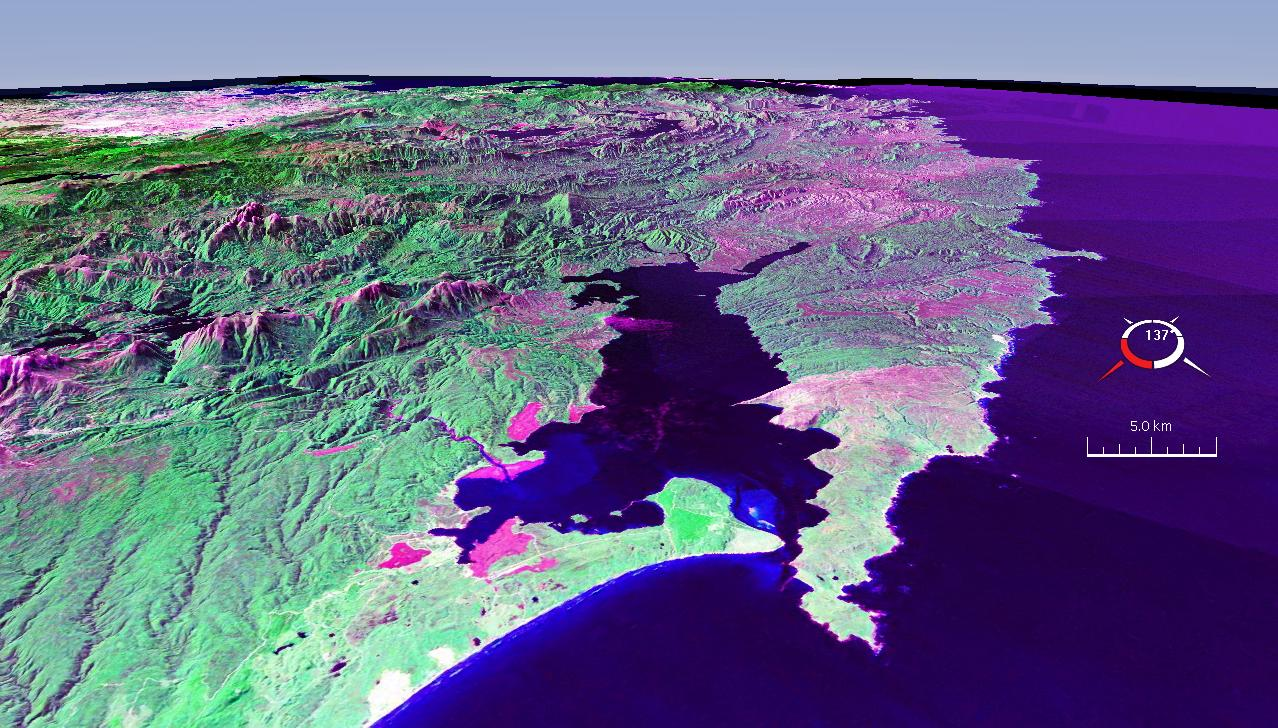
Macquarie Harbour, where many of the strandings have occurred

=== 2020 long-finned pilot whale stranding ===
In September 2020, more than 450 long-finned pilot whales stranded in Macquarie Harbour on the western coast of Tasmania, in Australia's worst-ever stranding event. Most were stranded on sandbanks and beaches around the mouth of the harbour. 50 were rescued, with the balance, 380 whales, dying.

=== 2022 pilot and sperm whale strandings ===
In September 2022, fourteen stranded sperm whales at King Island, most of which appeared to be young males according to the Department of Natural Resources and Environment spokesperson, were dead when they were reported in the afternoon of 19 September 2022.

Two days later, on 21 September 230 pilot whales, including young, stranded at Macquarie Heads, near to the location of and exactly two years after the 2020 stranding. The remote location made it difficult for rescue teams to reach the whales, with teams from the Environment Tasmania Marine Conservation Program working with the Tasmania Parks and Wildlife Service and Tasmania Police. The West Coast Council urged members of the public to stay clear unless they were invited by the rescue teams to assist, saying that "Having extra people can really hinder how they go about their rescue efforts." Locals have been covering the animals with blankets and pouring buckets of water over them. As of the morning of 22 September, 35 whales were still alive. Tanya Plibersek, Minister for the Environment and Water, wrote on Twitter: "Very distressing to see a large number of whales stranded in Tasmania. Many thanks to the experts and emergency personnel on site to assist efforts."
