= Zuiderduintjes =

Uninhabited island in the Netherlands

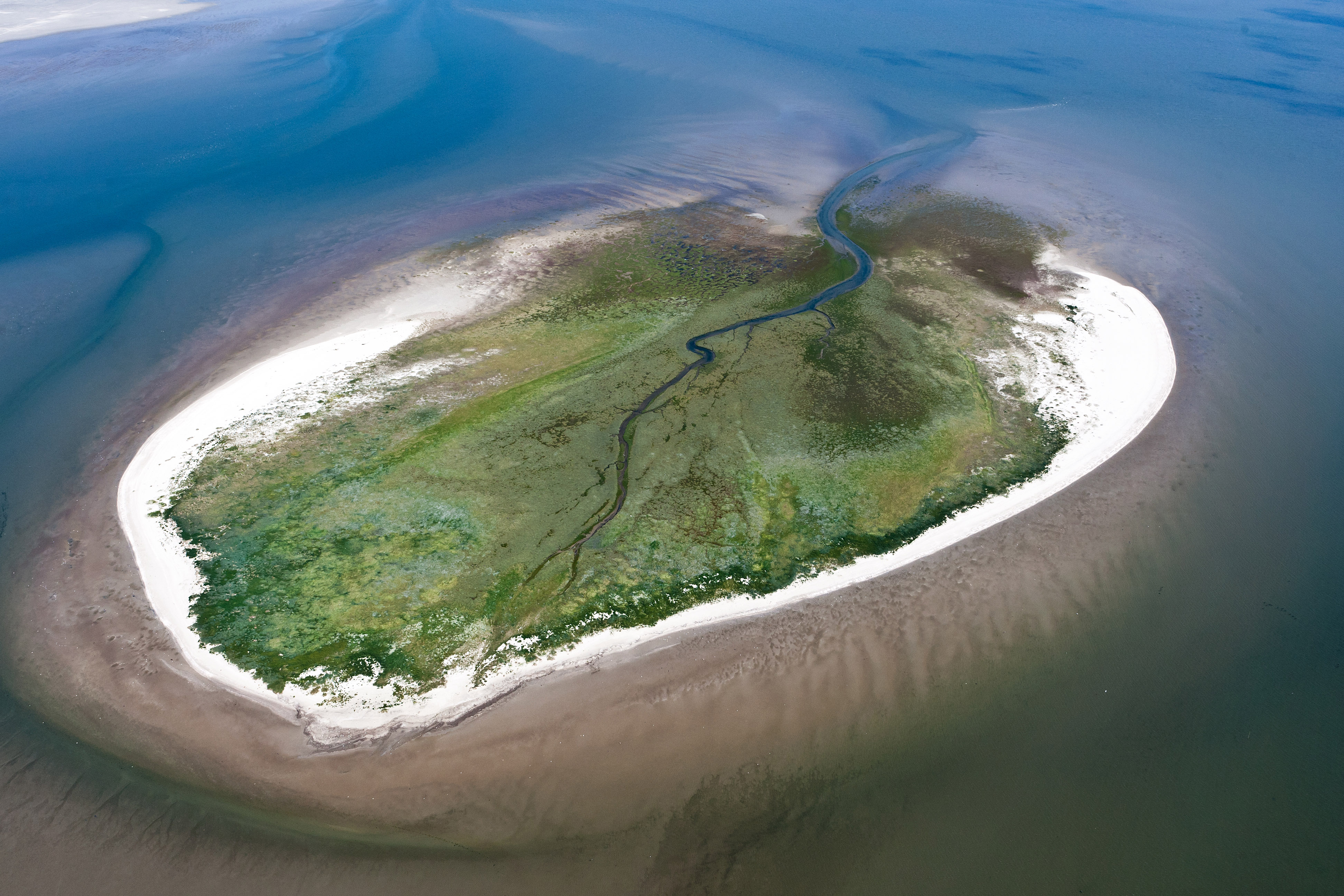
- Aerial photo of Zuiderduintjes in 2011
- Interactive map of Zuiderduintjes

Geography
- Coordinates: 53°31′20″N 6°35′20″E
- Archipelago: (West) Frisian Islands
- Adjacent to: North Sea, Wadden Sea
- Area: 74 ha (180 acres)

Administration
- Netherlands
- Province: Groningen
- Municipality: Het Hogeland

Demographics
- Population: Uninhabited

Zuiderduintjes (Dutch pronunciation: [ˈzœydərˌdœyɲtɕəs]; English: Little Southern Dunes) is an uninhabited island in the Wadden Sea in the Netherlands. It is situated south of Rottumeroog, east of Rottumerplaat, and west of Borkum. The island is one of the three West Frisian Islands in the municipality of Het Hogeland and in the province of Groningen.

Zuiderduintjes is part of the nature reserve Rottum and access to the island is prohibited.

== Geography ==
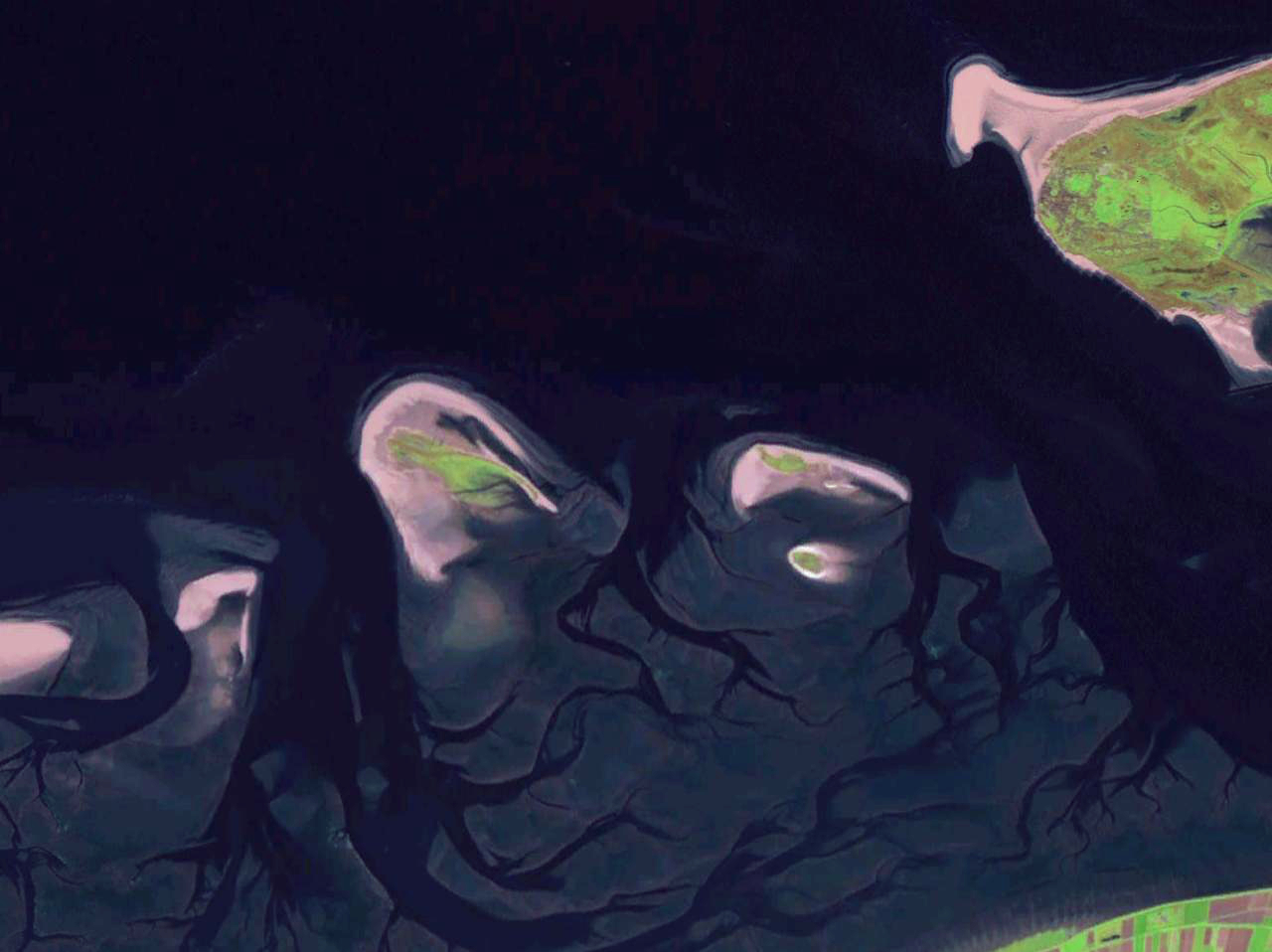
Satellite image of easternmost point of Schiermonnikoog, Simonszand, Rottumerplaat, Rottumeroog, Zuiderduintjes, and most of Borkum

Zuiderduintjes is one of the West Frisian Islands in the Wadden Sea. It is located at 53°31′20″N 6°35′20″E in the municipality of Het Hogeland in the province of Groningen in the Netherlands. It is situated off the coast of Groningen's mainland, south of the island of Rottumeroog, east of the island of Rottumerplaat, and southwest of the East Frisian island of Borkum.

It had a surface area of 57 ha (140 acres) in 1995 and 74 ha (180 acres) in 2007.

== History ==
Zuiderduintjes was part of the island of Rottumeroog, but has separated from it around 1930 and has since moved further southeast.

== Natural reserve ==
Zuiderduintjes is part of the nature reserve Rottum. Access to the island is prohibited since it is a resting and foraging area for birds and seals.

The island has a dune and salt marsh vegetation, and its plants include Elytrigia juncea subsp. boreoatlantica, Sonchus arvensis var. maritimus, Chenopodium album, Chenopodium rubrum, Matricaria maritima, Atriplex littoralis, Descurainia sophia, Artemisia maritima, Festuca rubra, Elytrigia maritima, Salicornia procumbens, and Suaeda maritima.
