= Bosch (island) =

Former island in the Wadden Sea

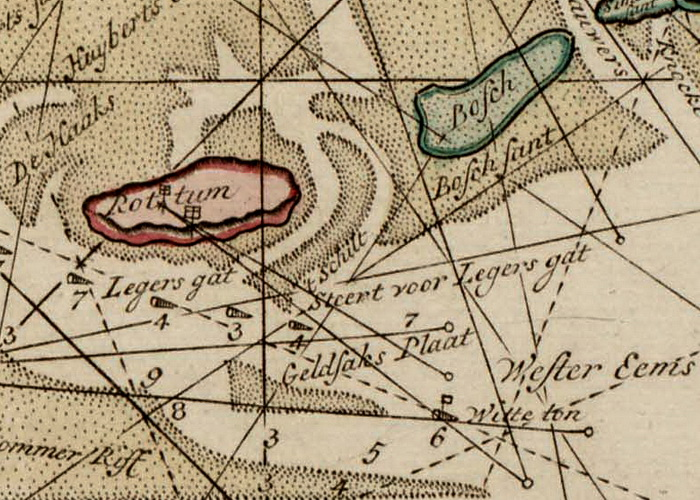
- Rottum and Bosch, pre-1682 (south at top)
- Interactive map of Bosch

Geography
- Coordinates: 53.5097°N 6.3939°E
- Archipelago: (West) Frisian Islands
- Adjacent to: North Sea, Wadden Sea

Administration
- Netherlands

Bosch (Dutch pronunciation: [bɔs]) was a West Frisian island in the Wadden Sea. It was situated off the coast of present-day Groningen in the Netherlands, between the islands of Schiermonnikoog and Rottumeroog.

Between 1400 and 1570 CE, the island Monnikenlangenoog had split into the islands Bosch and Rottumeroog. Bosch disappeared in the Christmas Flood of 1717. A shoal named Boschplaat was the remnant of the island, which merged into Rottumerplaat in 1959.
