= Cetacean strandings in Ghana =

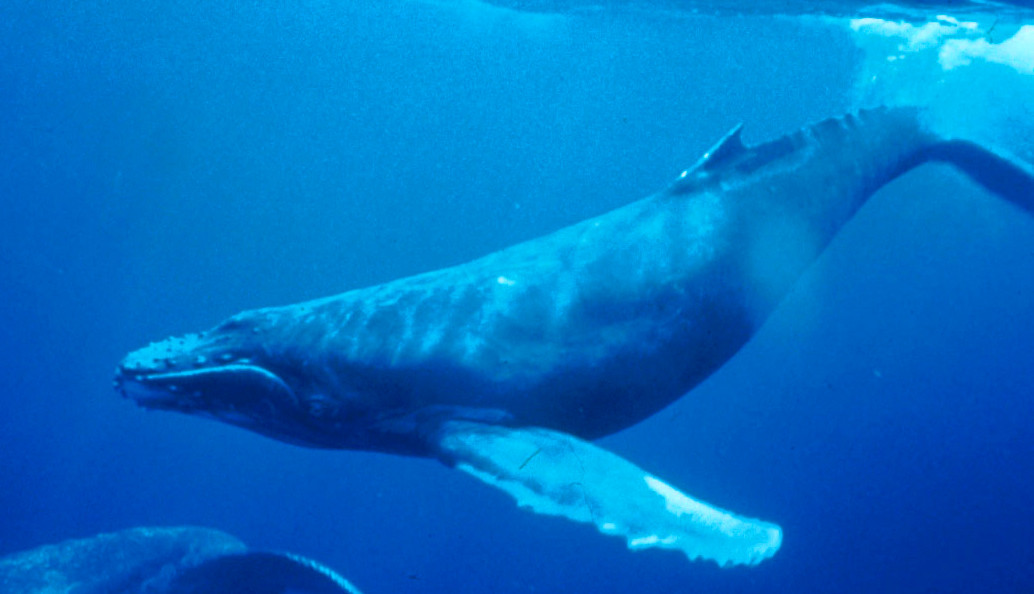
A humpback whale, one of the species reported stranded on Ghana's beaches

Cetacean strandings in Ghana appear to be becoming more common. Whales washing ashore may be due to ship strike, population dynamics, or an increase in human coverage and reporting. There are at least 28 species of cetaceans — seven baleen whales and 21 toothed whales — in the Gulf of Guinea, of which Ghana’s coast covers 550 km from Aflao to Axim. Scientific approaches to cetacean diversities have not been taken until recently, and 18 species were confirmed during researches.

== Types of whales ==
Whales in Ghanaian marine environment belong to species of families Ziphiidae (beaked whales), Physeteridae (sperm whales) and Kogiidae (pygmy sperm whales). 'Dolphins', and other species recorded along western African waters but not within Ghanaian waters such as blue whales, bryde's whales, and minke whales are not listed below. Most common of dolphins along Ghanaian waters include Atlantic humpback dolphins and common bottlenose dolphins.

=== Melon-headed whales ===
Melon-headed whales are accidentally caught in Ghana waters. Specimens have been landed in Shama in 1994 and four in Dixcove in 2000 and 2002. An adult-sized pygmy killer whale landed at Dixcove in December 2007 is the first documented record in the Gulf of Guinea. Status is unknown but, as elsewhere, pygmy killer whales are probably rare.

=== False killer whales ===
Records of false killer whales in Ghana is not abundant while the species regularly appears in the Gulf waters.

=== Pilot whales ===
Short-finned pilot whales seem to be common in Ghana marine waters, and also occur off the coast of Ivory Coast. Short-finned pilot whales are irregular by-catch victims in drift gill nets off Ghana (3.5% of cetacean catches,) and was landed at Shama, Axim and Dixcove. Most specimens are too big to haul onboard artisanal fishing boats and are towed to port. The Vridi specimen was harpooned for research purposes. A single skeletal specimen was known for Ghana and was probably collected in 1956.

=== Killer whales ===
Killer whales are present in Gulf of Guinea waters although population size is not considered in great numbers. A killer whale was harpooned some 15-20 nm south of Abidjan in 1958 but the animal sank. This shows that killer whales are present in the West African marine waters. Observers on industrial tuna purse-seiners reported a few sightings off the coast of Liberia, Ivory Coast and Ghana. The first record in Ghana comprises three false killer whales landed at Apam in 2003. Skulls were collected from a false killer whale stranded near Assini, Ivory Coast, in 1970 (van Bree, 1972) and from a specimen in Benin.

=== Cuvier's beaked whale ===
Cuvier's beaked whale (Ziphius cavirostris) Offshore Cuvier's beaked whale is a cosmopolitan ziphiid found in pelagic tropical to warm temperate waters. A juvenile landed at Axim in 1994 is the first documented beaked whale in the Gulf of Guinea. The status of Cuvier’s beaked whale is unknown, but no threats are identified. The single capture in Ghana among hundreds of other small cetaceans suggests that impact from bycatch is probably negligible.

=== Sperm whales ===
In Ghana, a dwarf sperm whale was taken by fishermen from Apam in 1998. Two unidentified Kogia sp. were landed, one at Shama in 1994 and another at Apam in 2003. Very little information is available on sperm whales in the Gulf of Guinea, however females and juveniles are believed to be present throughout the year beyond the continental shelf. This is because two dead sperm whales were washed ashore, first near Accra in 1994 and a second at Dixcove in 2002.

=== Humpback whale ===
Irvine 1947 recorded a possible humpback whale at Prampram in September 1938. Van Waerebeek and Ofori-Danson (1999) first confirmed the species from Ghana based on a fresh neonate stranded at Ada in September 1997. An adult-sized humpback whale stranded at Ada Foah in October 2006. Humpback whales are regularly sighted inshore from the Dixcove Castle, from September till December. A neonate stranded in Lomé, Togo, in August 2005. Rasmussen et al. (2007) encountered several pods including a mother and possible newborn calf in Ghanaian waters in October 2006. From the presence of humpback whales exclusively from early August till late November, and the frequent observations of neonates and ‘competitive groups’, it is evident that the continental shelf of Benin, Togo, Ghana, and western Nigeria hosts a breeding/calving population with a Southern Hemisphere seasonality, referred to as the ‘Gulf of Guinea stock’. Its parametric distribution suggests it may be related to the IWC-defined breeding stock ‘B’ from central-west Africa. Mother and calf pairs have been sighted exclusively near shore in Benin, sometimes just beyond the surf-zone. The westernmost authenticated record is a stranding at Assini Mafia, eastern Ivory Coast in August 2007. For many years, small-scale, seasonal humpback whale-watching sorties have been conducted from the ports of Sekondi-Takoradi, Lomé and Cotonou. The breeding stock off Gabon and Angola is the subject of longterm dedicated studies. Possibly up to 10% of world population of humpbacks migrate into Gulf of Guinea.

No abundance estimate is available for the Bight of Benin population, but the encounter rate in October 2000 was approximately 5.9 humpback whales per 100 km surveyed (0.109/nautical mile) . The reported neonates stranded in unknown circumstances of natural and anthropogenic causes are possible. At least some humpback whale strandings in the area are thought to be animals killed in vessel collisions, which may be far more common in African waters than scarce reports suggest. Humpback whales near Cotonou’s harbour entrance and crossing the main shipping lanes, incur obvious risk. The individual that stranded at Assini Mafia was reported with external trauma consistent with a propeller hit.

About five of the whales which died are hunchbacks which were stranded in Ghanaian waters. Ghana’s coast forms part of the distribution range of a ‘Gulf of Guinea’ humpback whale breeding stock with estimated population at over 10,000 individuals.

== Paths of whales ==
Ghana is on a path of migration for whales heading from South Africa to the waters off Britain and with the current flowing east, whatever killed the whales could be off the coast of Ivory Coast or further west. Some whales from the eastern North Atlantic migrate to the tropical coast of western Africa and the Cape Verde Islands Various methods are used including satellite tags which can track whale movements in near real time. It is not known why humpback whales migrate although possible suggestions include predator avoidance and the energetic benefits of warm water during the winter when food production is low in the feeding grounds. Swimming off the coast of Africa, humpback whales encounter more than warm waters for mating and bearing young, according to a new study led by the Wildlife Conservation Society (WCS). They also encounter offshore oil rigs, major shipping routes and potentially harmful toxicants.

== Death of whales ==
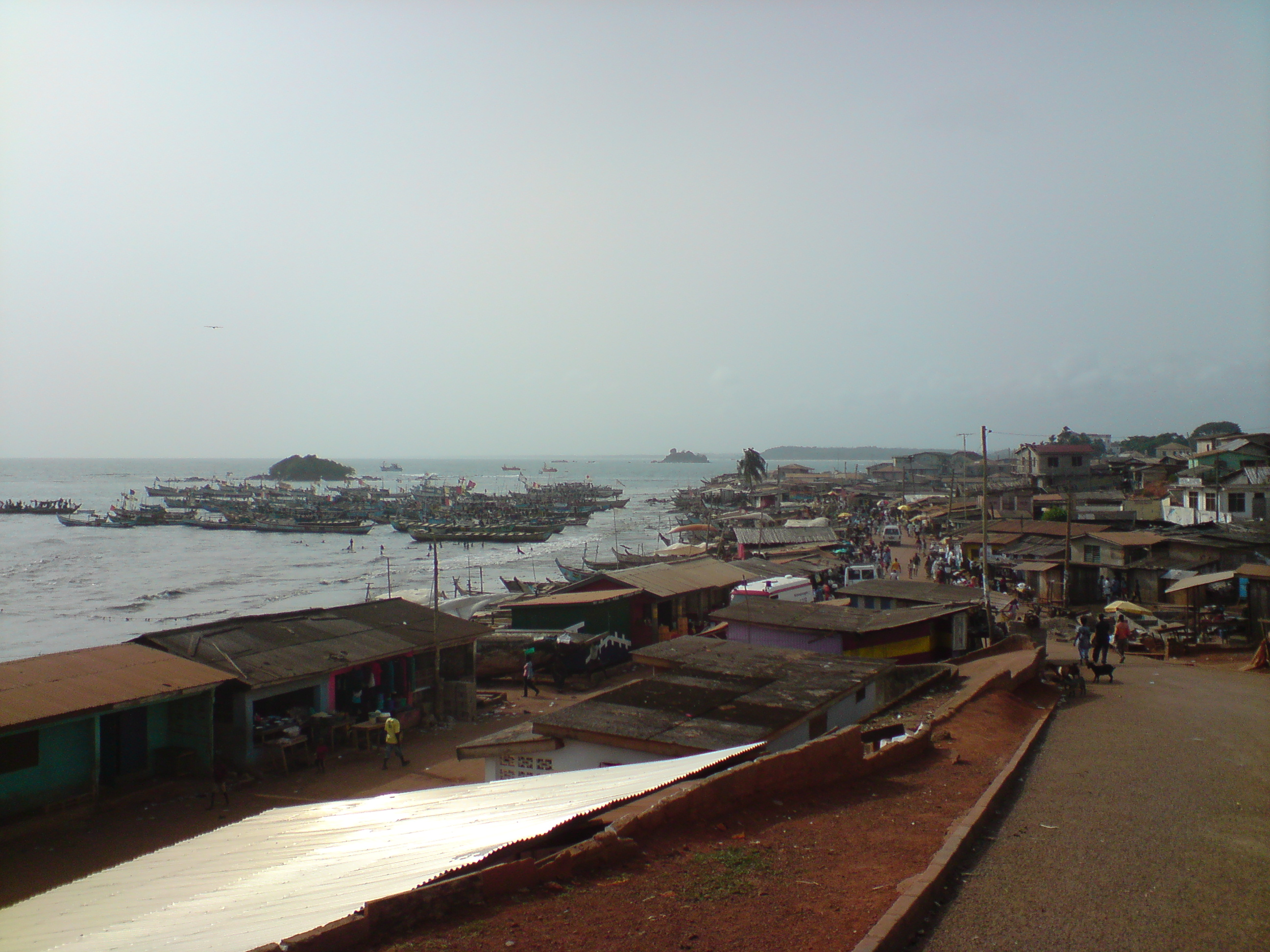
Some of the strandings have been at Axim, a fishing village

Most of the deaths of the whales have occurred at the coast of the Western Region of Ghana and raised fears that it was the oil drilling that is responsible for the deaths. Since the discovery of oil in 2007 some environmentalists are skeptical whether oil and gas will be handled judiciously to avoid environmental degradation. Decomposed whale carcasses have been washing onto beaches in western region making environmental groups worried the country's growing petroleum industry may be killing marine life. Local people count a total of 20 dead whales discovered along Ghana's coastline in the last four years, including at least eight since September 2013. Whales are mammals and what kills them is still unresolved.

=== Causes of death of whales ===
Speculations on the causes of death have generated heated arguments. Some Ghanaians believe that with the start of the exploration of oil and gas in 2007 to 2010 eleven whales have died within three years. They believe that seismic air guns used for oil exploration generate so much noise that if a whale goes deaf it cannot survive.

The academia is not sure of the causes of death of the whales. "It's definitely unusual. But what may be the cause we can't put our finger on," said A.K. Armah, a lecturer at the University of Ghana, who studies marine life.

“...dead whales that have been washed ashore in Ghana were in a decomposed state and, therefore, samples could not be taken for laboratory analysis to ascertain the cause of death,” the Ministry of Fisheries and the Fisheries Commission said in a joint statement signed by the sector Minister, Mr Nayon Bilijo. The Fisheries Commission said: “The cause of death of the whales is not due to negligence or inaction on the part of competent authorities responsible for the regulation and management of the Ghanaian marine waters”. It explained that the death of a whale could be due to ageing, infectious disease related to bacterial, fungal, viral and parasitic infection or non-infectious diseases related to failure of internal organs.

The Environmental Protection Agency officials took samples of the carcass for analyses. The Agency said the incidence of whales being washed ashore was a global occurrence and not limited to Ghana. From February 2011 to September 2, 2013, over 120 different types of whales have been reported washed ashore at various locations around the globe", a statement from the Public Affairs Department of the EPA said. The EPA said after the discovery of the five dead whales last year that the situation was "of much concern" but it was not unprecedented.

It is believed that whales and other marine mammals rely on their hearing to find food, friends and mating partners and when a very powerful sound fills their ears this can reorient them. The Natural Resources Defense Council an environmental advocacy group believes that oil and gas exploration is leading to overwhelming whale deaths in the Gulf of Guinea. Similar cases have happened in the Canary Islands and Hawaii. There is a belief that ocean noise presents a significant threat to marine mammals and other marine species.

The head of the International Fund for Animal Welfare's whale programme, Patrick Ramage said collisions with ships, water pollution and seismic activity from oil drilling can kill or disorient whales.

=== Local reaction ===
The local people along the beach have reacted to the deaths in a variety of ways. On November 21, 2013, people of Domunli, a coastal community in the Nzema East Municipality in the Western Region, held a funeral for a 10.4 meter long dead sperm whale that has washed ashore at the beach. This was the 21st dead whale washed ashore on the coast of Ghana since 2009. The Chief Fishermen and elders from nearby communities Axim and Egyan got together to pour libation and say prayers to the gods to help them unravel the mystery of the rampant washing ashore of dead whales. Community members complained to the EPA that the rampant washing ashore of dead whales was rather bad omen for the fisher folks and coastal communities and that they needed answers from them as to what was the cause.

In the case of the dead whale washed up in Nkontompo, local fishermen hauled the carcass to the beach where they dug a hole. It was then buried after pouring libation. Being an uncommon event for the local community, crowds of curious people had gathered to catch a glimpse of the dead mammal.

== Public calls ==
The increased rate of whales death became great concern to the general public. Environmental Non-Governmental Organisations (NGOs) Chiefs and people have called on institutions such as the Environmental Protection Agency (EPA), Fisheries Commission (FC), Ghana Navy, Ministry of Environment, Science, Technology and Innovation (MESTI), Ministry of Energy (MoE) and Ministry of Fisheries (MoF) to investigate the causes of the deaths and find lasting solutions to this problem.
