= Bethlehem, Groningen =

Coordinates: 53°23′0″N 6°36′35″E

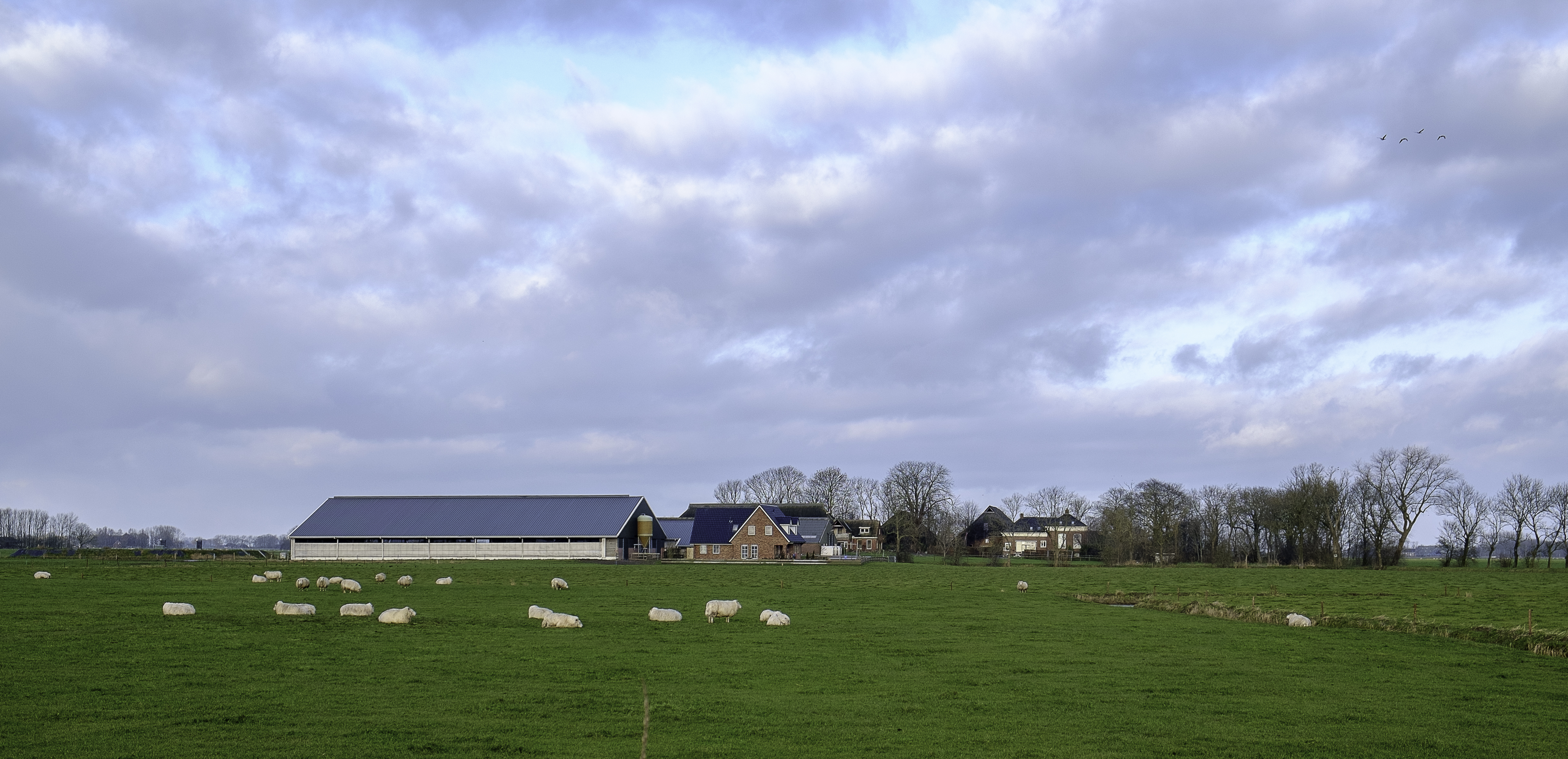
Bethlehem in 2014

Bethlehem is a hamlet just west of the village of Rottum, in the Dutch province of Groningen. Since 2019, it is part of the municipality of Het Hogeland.

Bethlehem is built at the location of a Benedictine nunnery. Together with the St. Juliana's Abbey a small distance to the north, the nunnery was mentioned in 1291 as the Conventus St. Juliane in Rotthem. The church of the abbey was broken down in 1658, and nothing of the abbey remains nowadays.
