= Rottum (island group) =

Nature reserve in the Wadden Sea in the Netherlands

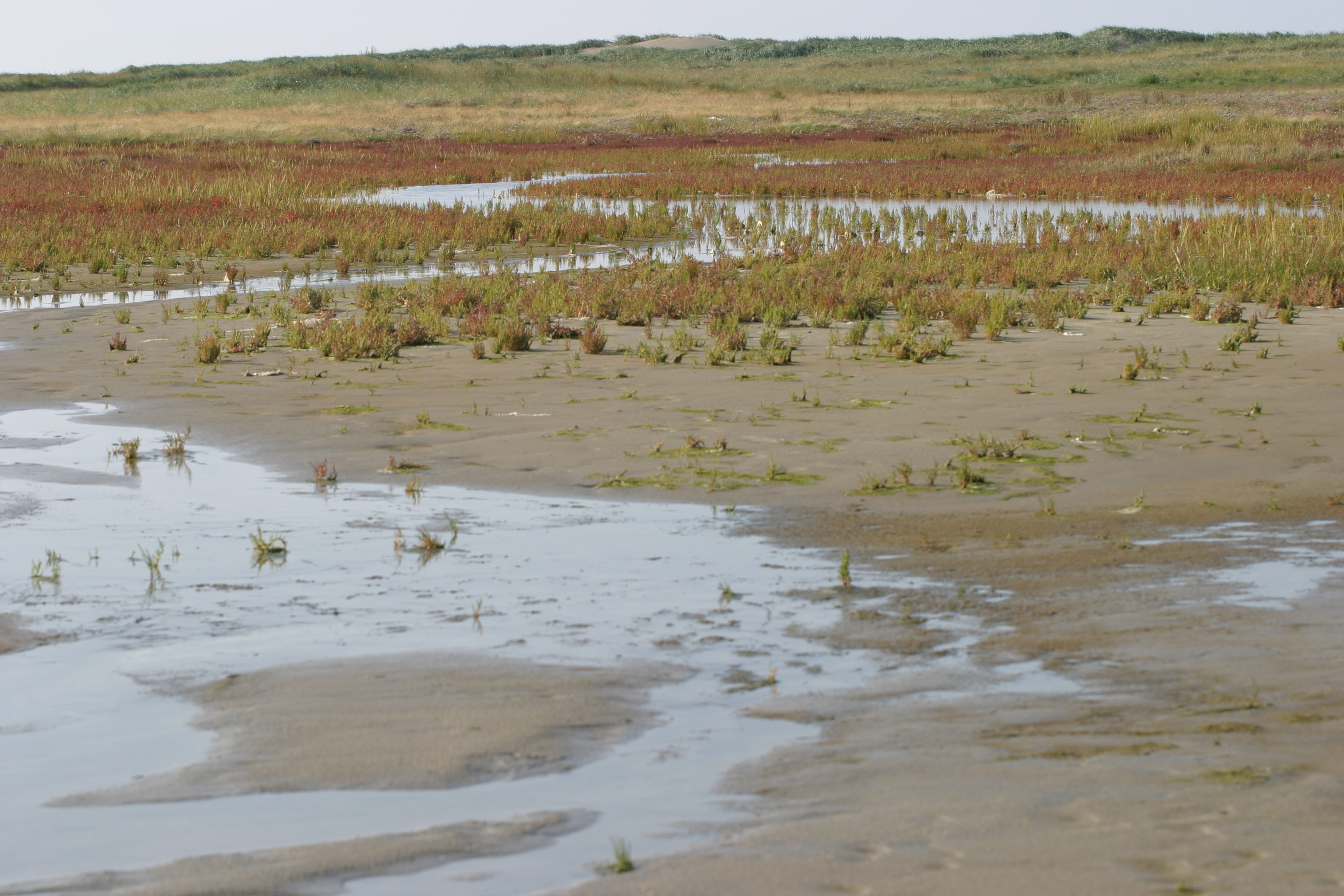
- Rottumeroog in 2005

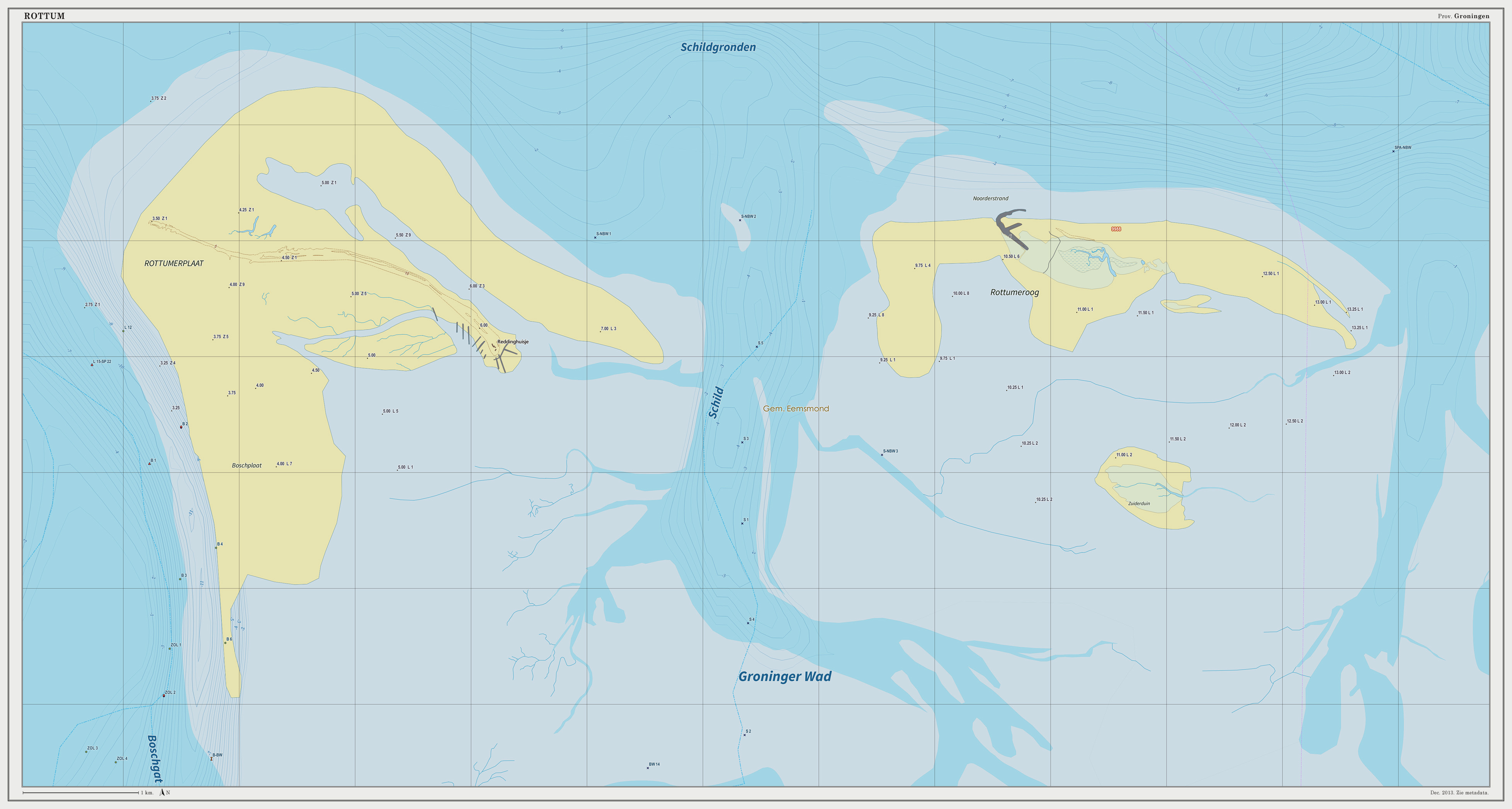
- Map of the three islands of Rottum (2013)
- Location: Het Hogeland, Groningen, Netherlands
- Coordinates: 53.534°N 6.542°E
- Area: 7,400 ha (18,000 acres)

Rottum (Dutch pronunciation: [ˈrɔtʏm]) is a nature reserve in the Wadden Sea in the Netherlands. It consists of the three West Frisian Islands Rottumerplaat, Rottumeroog, and Zuiderduintjes. As a nature reserve, Rottum receives highest protection status under Dutch law; admission to the islands is restricted. The Dutch Ministry of Agriculture, Nature and Food Quality and the government organisations Rijkswaterstaat and Staatsbosbeheer share responsibility for the nature reserve.
