= Rottumeroog =

Island in the Netherlands

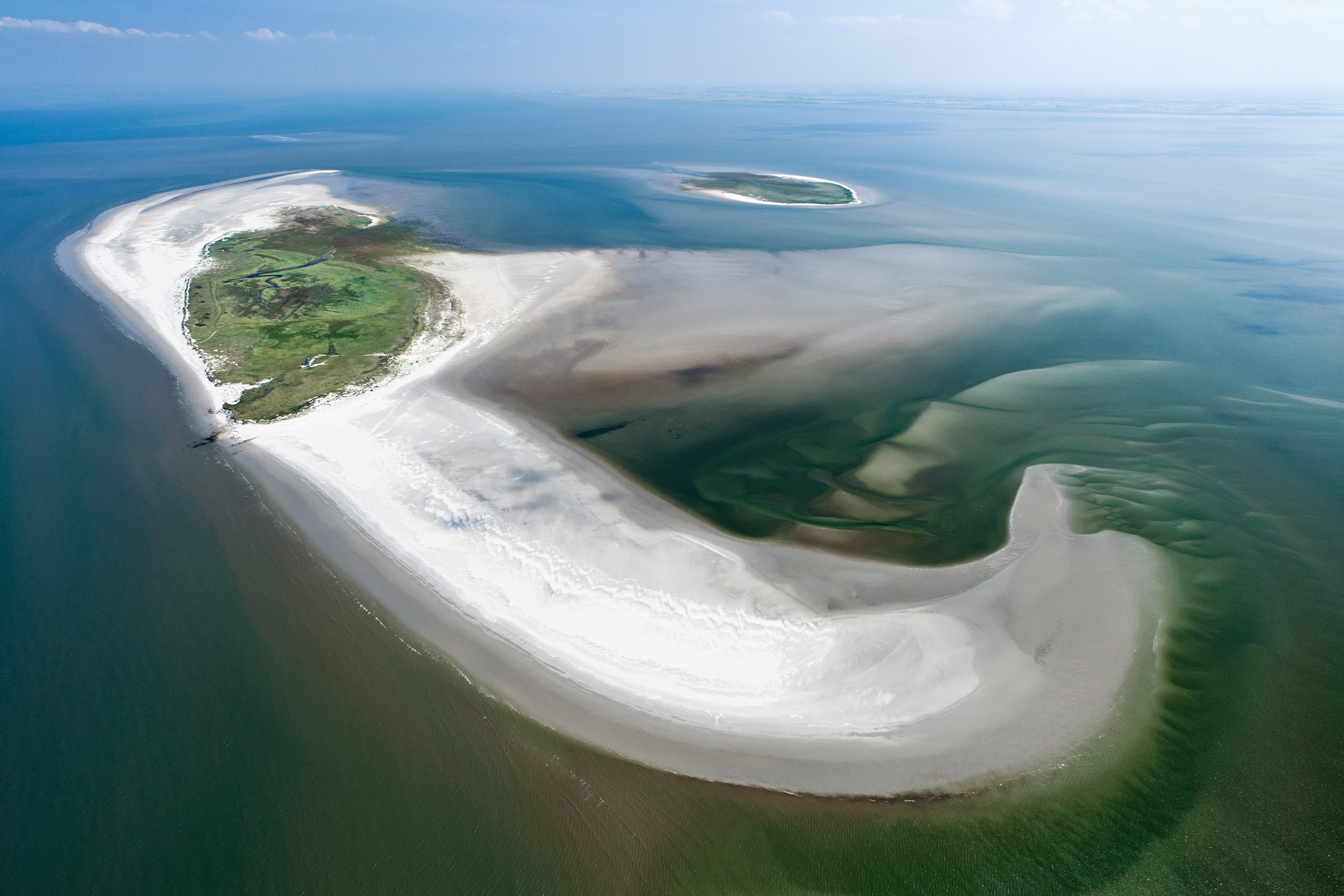
- Aerial photo of Rottumeroog in 2011, with Zuiderduintjes in the background

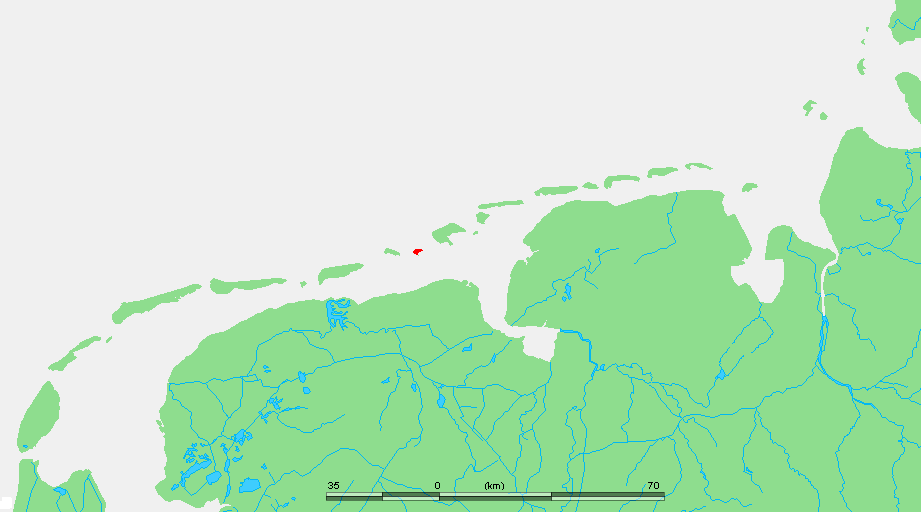
- Location of Rottumeroog in the Wadden Sea

Geography
- Coordinates: 53°32′25″N 6°34′55″E
- Archipelago: (West) Frisian Islands
- Adjacent to: North Sea, Wadden Sea
- Area: 265 ha (650 acres)
- Highest elevation: 12.0 m (39.4 ft)

Administration
- Netherlands
- Province: Groningen
- Municipality: Het Hogeland

Demographics
- Population: Uninhabited

Rottumeroog (Dutch pronunciation: [ˌrɔtʏmərˈoːx]; West Frisian: Rottumereach) is an uninhabited island in the Wadden Sea and is part of the Netherlands. The island is one of three West Frisian Islands in the province of Groningen. It is situated between the islands of Rottumerplaat and Borkum.

The island originates from the 15th or 16th century. At first the island was used for agriculture by the St. Juliana's Abbey from Rottum. Rottumeroog is now part of the natural reserve Rottum and access to the island is prohibited, save for people with a special permit.

== Geography ==
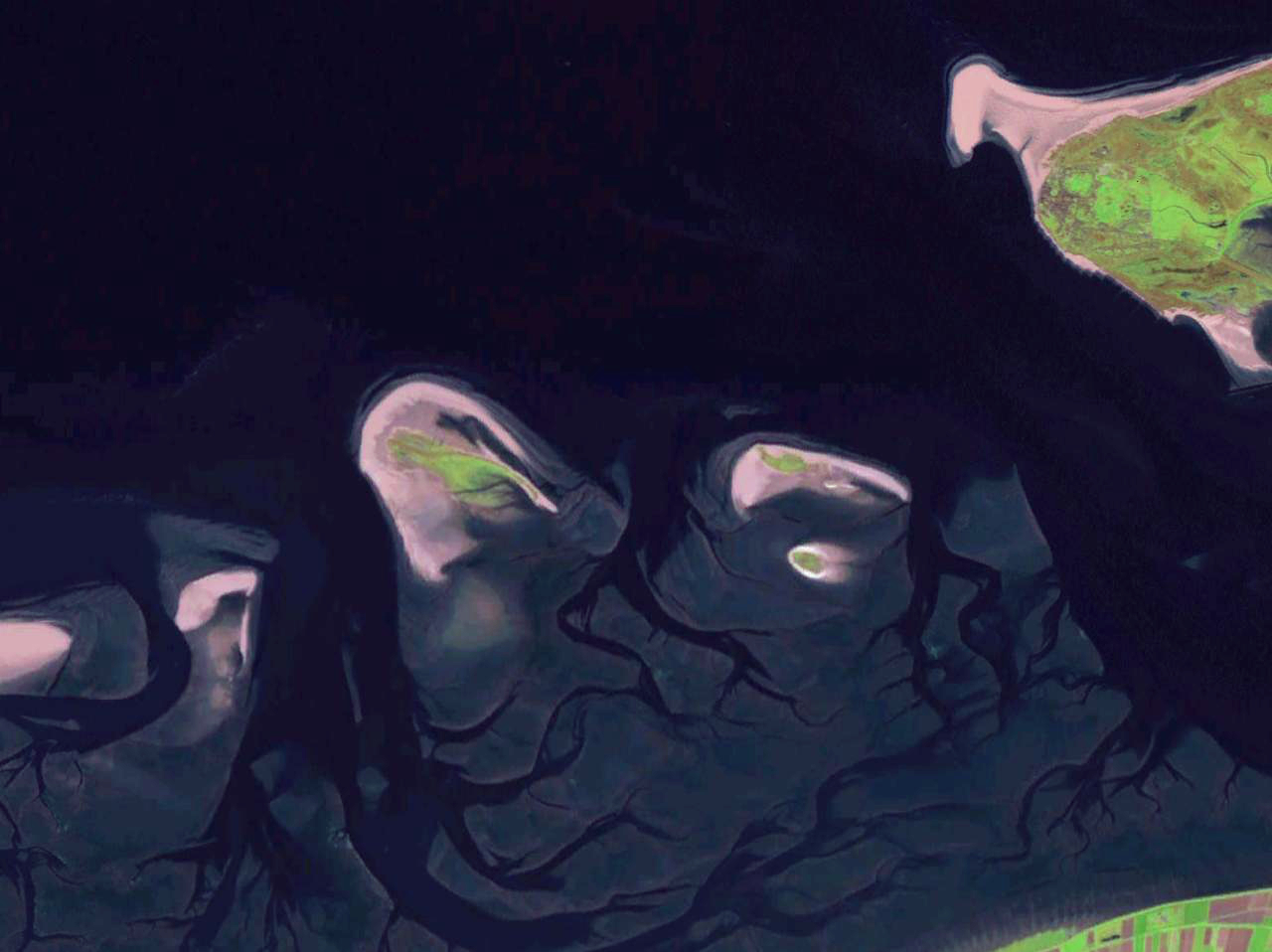
Satellite image of easternmost point of Schiermonnikoog, Simonszand, Rottumerplaat, Rottumeroog, Zuiderduintjes, and most of Borkum

Rottumeroog is located at 53°32′25″N 6°34′55″E in the municipality of Het Hogeland in the north of the province of Groningen in the north of the Netherlands. It is situated off the coast of Groningen's mainland and it is the easternmost island of the West Frisian Islands in the Wadden Sea, east of the island of Rottumerplaat, north of the island of Zuiderduintjes, and west of the East Frisian island of Borkum (Germany).

Rottumeroog does not have a solid core and slowly moves in southeastern direction as a result of sea currents. On the north side, land is gradually washed away; on the south side, new land is forming. Rottumeroog had a surface area of 205 ha (510 acres) in 1995 and 265 ha (650 acres) in 2007.

== History ==
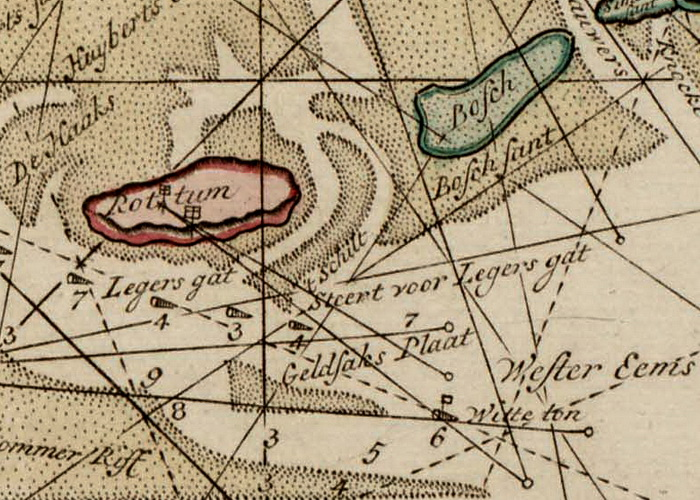
Rottum and Bosch, pre-1682 (south at top)

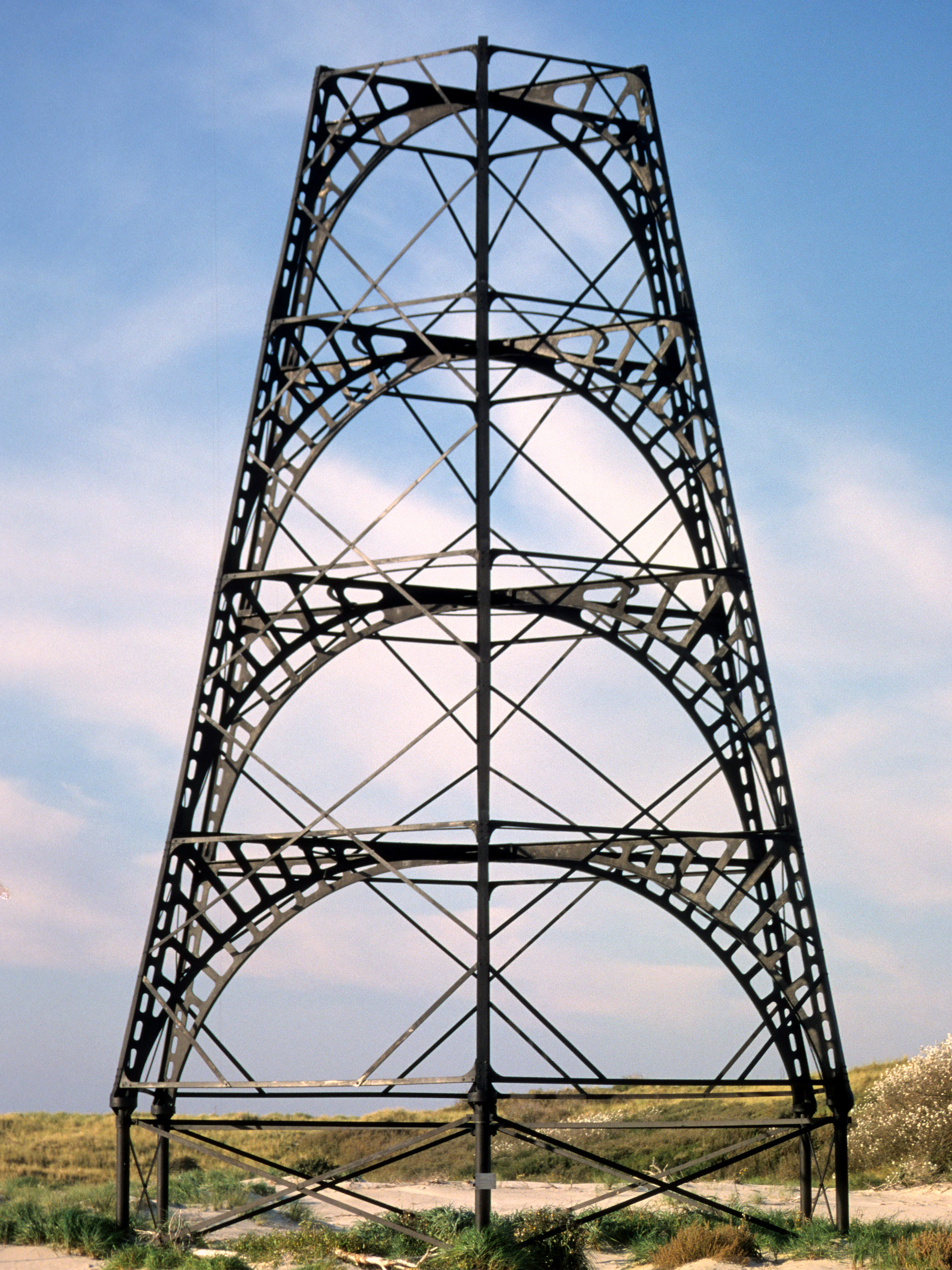
The navigational beacon Zeekaap Rottumeroog in 1996

Between 1400 and 1540 CE, the island of Monnikenlangenoog had split into the islands of Bosch and Rottumeroog. Bosch had disappeared in the 18th century, but Rottumeroog still remains today.

The name Rottumeroog means literally 'Island of Rottum', after the village of Rottum on the mainland of Groningen. The Benedictine St. Juliana's Abbey in Rottum used to own two-thirds of the island and used it for their livestock. After the Protestant Reformation the island's rights transferred to the province Groningen before being sold to private persons in the 17th century.

Between 1706 and 1717, Donough MacCarthy, 4th Earl of Clancarty, having been banished from Ireland, owned and lived on the island.

The province bought the island back in 1738 due to back maintenance, eventually the central government took over. Until 1965 the island was inhabited by a vogt and his family; since then the island has been uninhabited.

Several buildings have been built on the island. In the 19th century the navigational beacon Zeekaap Rottumeroog was built. The structure is listed as a national heritage site (rijksmonument) since 1988 and was moved southwards in 1999. The voogt had a house as well; this building was demolished in 1998 due to the encroaching North Sea. In February 2014, the bird observation post was removed from the island. Later in 2014 all remaining buildings on the islands, except for the Zeekaap Rottumeroog were removed due to the changing shape and position of the island.

The future area of the island is uncertain. In 2012, the island broke into two during high tide, giving rise to the claim that the island might disappear in the Ems estuary in the near future.

== Natural reserve ==
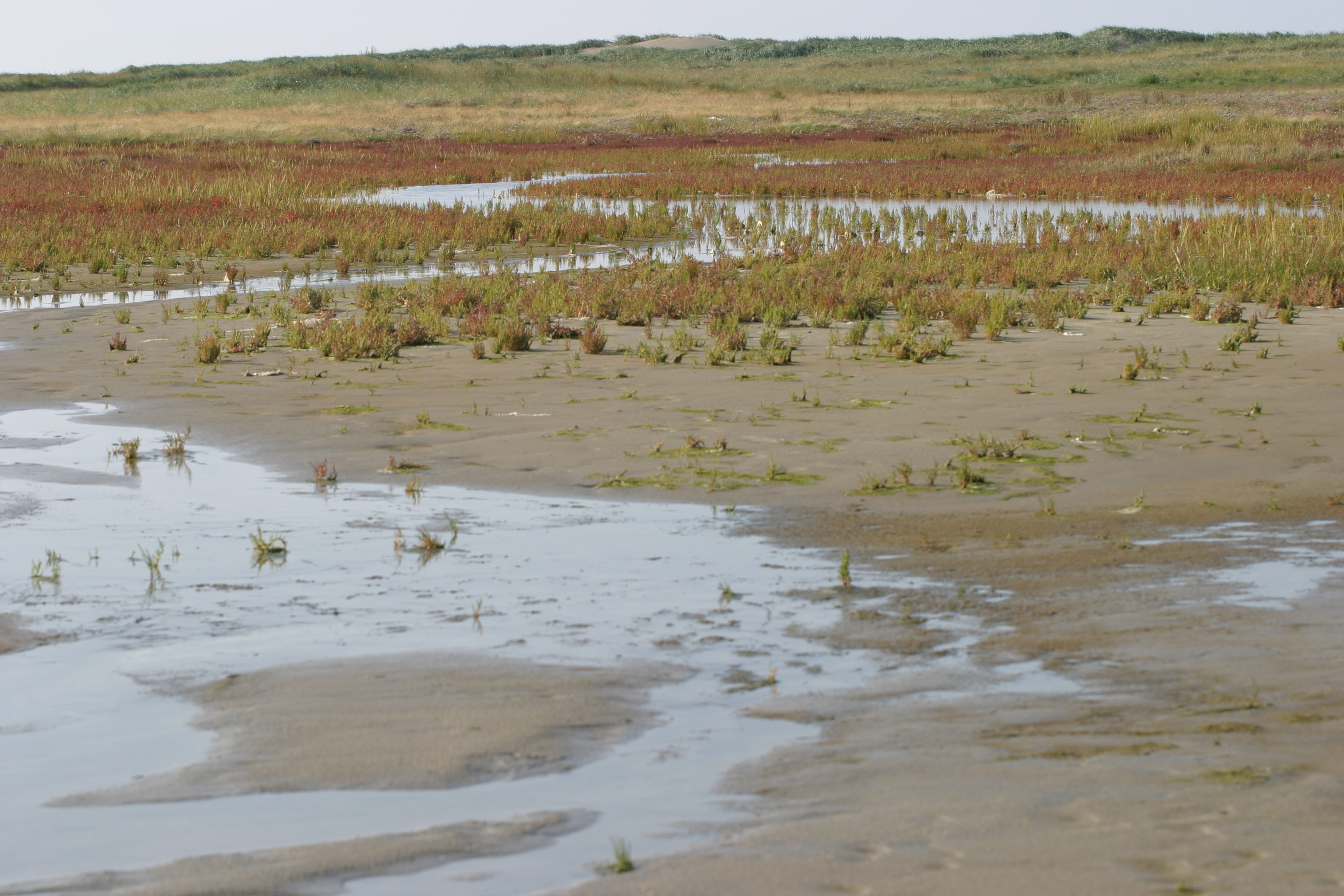
Landscape of Rottumeroog in September 2005

The Wadden Sea, in which Rottumeroog is situated, is a UNESCO World Heritage Site (natural criteria viii, ix, and x) since 2009.

Together with Rottumerplaat and Zuiderduintjes, the island forms the natural reserve Rottum. The island is generally not maintained, the shape and position are left for nature to change. The island is uninhabited and access is usually prohibited; several excursions to the islands are allowed each year under strict conditions.

The island is home to birds and grey seals.
