= Saint Juliana's Abbey =

Benedictine abbey

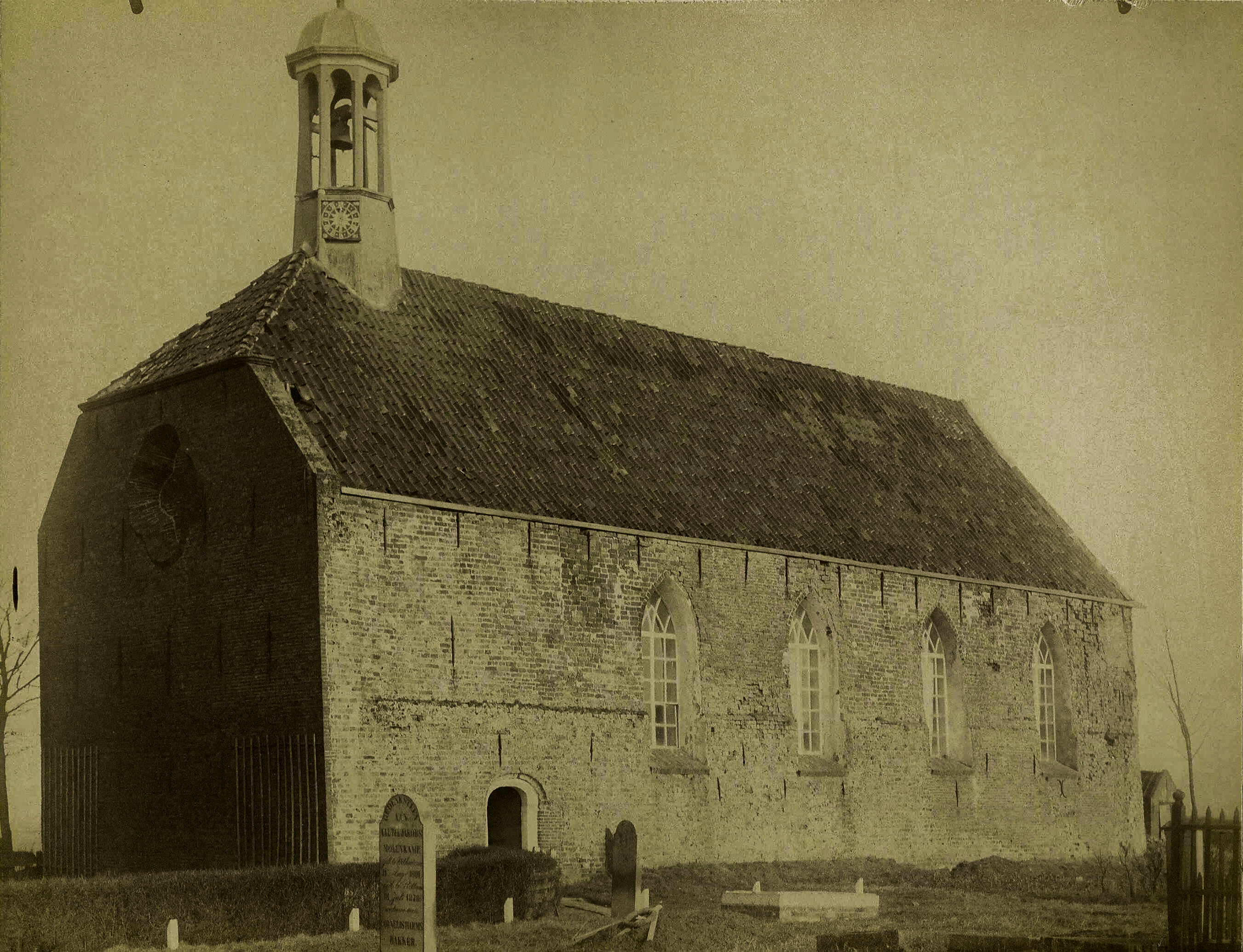
The abbey's church, a few years before its demolition in the late 19th century

Saint Juliana's Abbey (Dutch: Sint-Julianaklooster) was a Benedictine abbey dedicated to Juliana of Nicomedia in Rottum in the present-day Netherlands.

The abbey was probably founded between 1195 and 1210 by monks from the Benedictine Werden Abbey in Germany. After its foundation hundreds of idols, Fosta and Thor among them, were stolen by Liudger from the monastery and transported to Utrecht and other locations.

The monastery was owner of two-thirds of the nearby island of Rottumeroog.

The monastery had serious financial troubles in 1470, so the abbot of Sint Juliana asked the bishop of Münster for permission to take goods from the deanery in nearby Usquert. This eventually happened after the decease of the dean of Usquert in 1475. The deanery did not accept it, and mediation from Pope Sixtus IV was required to restore peace between the monastery of Saint Juliana and Usquert deanery, which eventually happened in 1480.

The abbey was burned down by the Geuzen under William Louis of Nassau-Dillenburg in 1587. The remains of the cruciform abbey church were demolished in 1885.

Nearby was a nunnery named Bethlehem.
