= Rottumerplaat =

Island in the West Frisian Islands

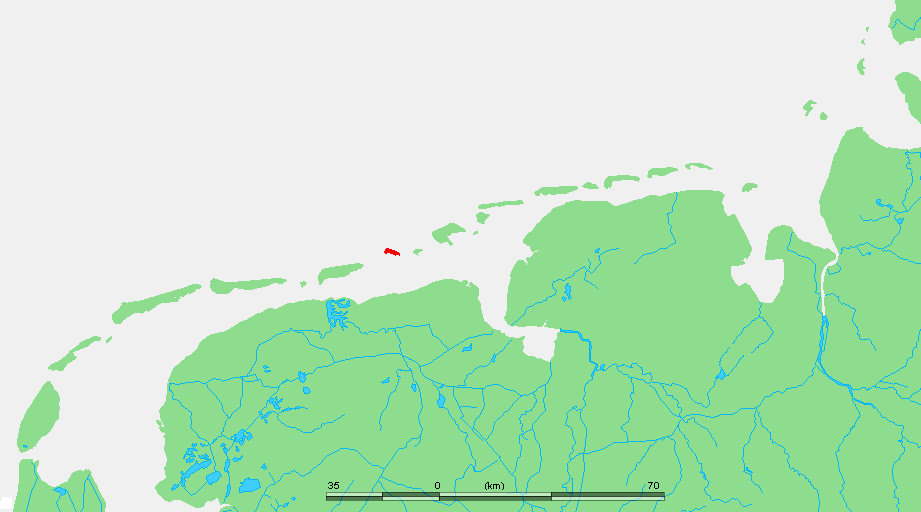
- Location of Rottumerplaat in the Wadden Sea

Geography
- Coordinates: 53°32′30″N 6°28′51″E
- Archipelago: (West) Frisian Islands
- Adjacent to: North Sea, Wadden Sea
- Area: 6–7 km^{2} (2.3–2.7 sq mi)

Administration
- Netherlands
- Province: Groningen
- Municipality: Het Hogeland

Demographics
- Population: Uninhabited

Rottumerplaat (Dutch pronunciation: [ˌrɔtʏmərˈplaːt]) is one of the three islands that make up Rottum in the West Frisian Islands. The island is located in the North Sea off the Dutch coast. It is situated between the shoal Simonszand and the island Rottumeroog. Rottumerplaat started as a shoal in the 1830s. It continued to grow into an island after 1950, when a stuifdijk, a wind-blown dike, was constructed by Rijkswaterstaat, because there were plans to use Rottumerplaat as a work island for the reclamation of the Wadden Sea.

In 1959, the Boschplaat merged with Rottumerplaat. Sediment deposition has caused the island to become significantly larger in recent years. Access to the island is prohibited since Rottumerplaat is a resting and forage area for numerous bird species. Rijkswaterstaat and Staatsbosbeheer are responsible for the administration of the island. Rottumerplaat is the northernmost point of the Netherlands.

== Fauna ==
Rottumerplaat is a resting and forage area for sanderling, dunlin and Kentish plovers. Common eider, common shelduck, Arctic tern, common tern, little tern, Kentish plover, and ringed plover nest on the island. From 1996 the Sandwich tern nested on Rottumerplaat, but has since stopped doing so.

The first detailed ecological study of the decomposition of a stranded dead whale was carried out with a minke whale (Balaenoptera acutorostrata) beached on Rottumerplaat on 25 November 2020. The carcass was examined at regular intervals over the following two years, recording the scavengers and other species that used it.

== Godfried Bomans and Jan Wolkers ==
In 1971 writers Jan Wolkers and Godfried Bomans each spent a week on the island. Their only connection with the outside world was a short daily radio relay with VARA radio presenter Willem Ruis, who stayed at a hotel in nearby Warffum. The interviews were broadcast as a radio programme, Alone On An Island. For Godfried Bomans, the stay on the island was a disaster; he could not cope with the noise the many seagulls made and he was troubled by loneliness. Jan Wolkers however experienced his stay on the island as an adventure and kept himself alive by catching shrimps and eel, and boiling sea sandwort. He also rescued a young seal. Both authors published a book about their stay on the island.
