= Macquarie Heads =

- Town
- Coordinates: 42°12′55″S 145°11′53″E
- Country: Australia
- State: Tasmania
- Region: West Coast
- LGA: West Coast
- Location: 14 km (8.7 mi) SW of Strahan

Government
  - State electorate: Braddon
  - Federal division: Braddon
- Postcode: 7468
Localities around Macquarie Heads
| | Southern Ocean |
| Southern Ocean | Macquarie Heads | Macquarie Harbour |
| | West Coast |

Macquarie Heads is a rural locality in the local government area of West Coast in the West Coast region of Tasmania. The locality is on the western side of the entrance to Macquarie Harbour and has no road access. The headland on the eastern side of the entrance is in the locality of Strahan, but is known locally as Macquarie Heads. It is located about 14 kilometres (8.7 mi) south-west of the town of Strahan. The 2016 census contains no information for the state suburb of Macquarie Heads.

== History ==
The locality was gazetted in 1968. It had previously been known as Napier.

== Geography ==
The locality is surrounded on three sides by the Southern Ocean and Macquarie Harbour.

== Road infrastructure ==
The C251 route (Macquarie Heads Road) runs from Strahan to the end of the headland on the eastern side of the harbour entrance.
