= Rottum, Groningen =

Rottum
- Village
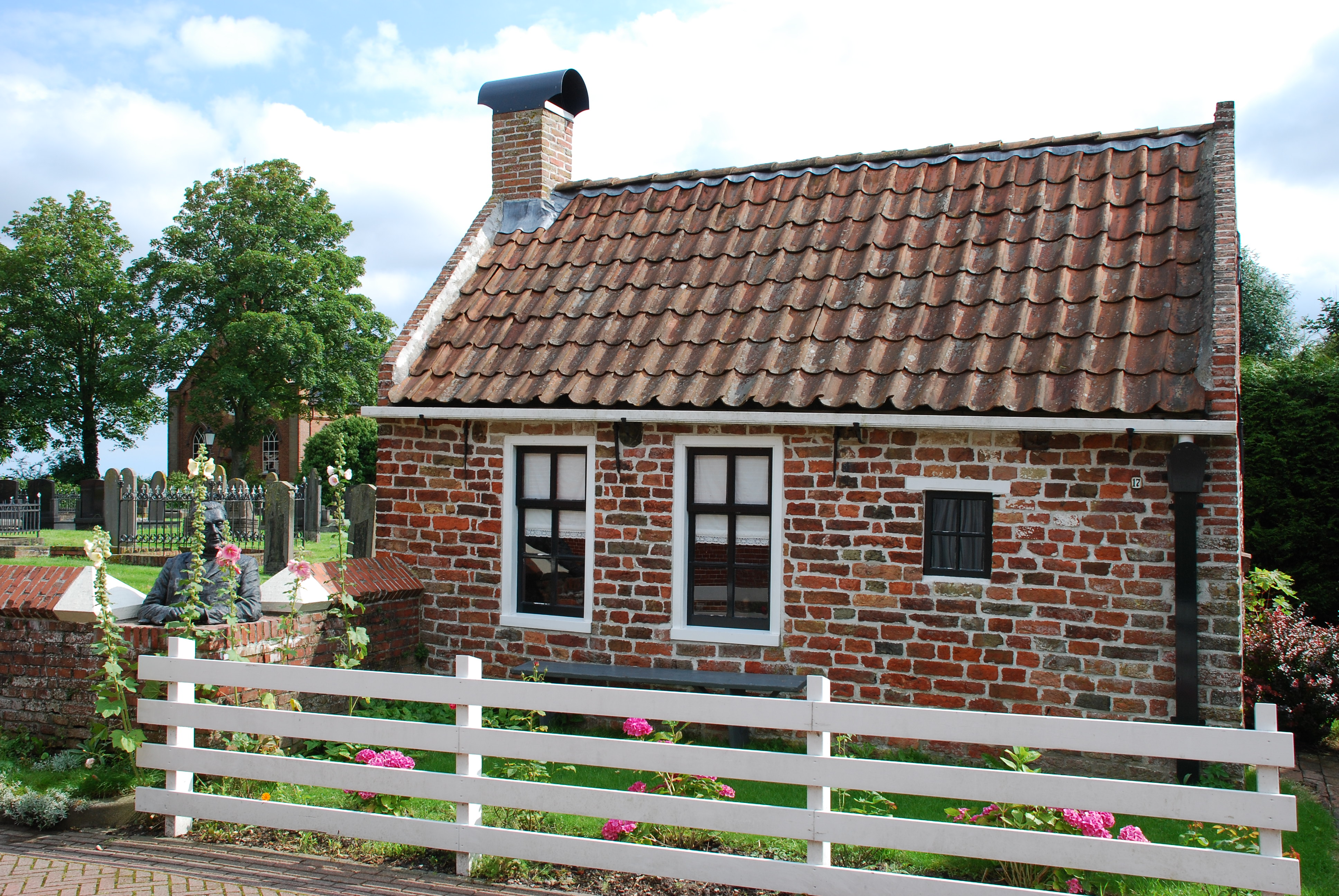
- A tiny house, Jan Boer's bust, and the church in the background

- Location of Rottum in the province of Groningen Rottum (Netherlands)
- Coordinates: 53°22′55″N 6°37′13″E
- Country: Netherlands
- Province: Groningen
- Municipality: Het Hogeland

Area
  - Total: 0.12 km^{2} (0.046 sq mi)
- Elevation: 0.8 m (2.6 ft)

Population (2021)
  - Total: 90
  - Density: 750/km^{2} (1,900/sq mi)
- Time zone: UTC+1 (CET)
  - Summer (DST): UTC+2 (CEST)
- Postal code: 9998
- Dialing code: 0595

Rottum (or Röppen) is a small village on an artificial dwelling hill between Kantens and Usquert in the municipality of Het Hogeland, falling under the province Groningen in the Netherlands. It had a population of around 85 in January 2017.

== History ==
=== Heathen chapel ===
The village was founded on a clay bank of the Fivel estuary and the Wadden Sea. Since high tides were threatening the early inhabitants they raised its height with manure and waste: this way an artificial dwelling hill was created. On top of the artificial dwelling hill eventually a heathen chapel was located, according to the biography of the missionary Ludger. The name "Rottum" could be derived from "rot Heim", which can be translated as "red dwelling-place".

=== Monastery ===
St. Juliana's Abbey was a Benedictine monastery, probably founded between 1195 and 1210 by monks from the Benedictine Werden Abbey in Germany. The monastery was demolished at the end of the 1800s.

Rottumeroog or Rottum, an island in the Waddenzee, is named after the village since the monastery was two-thirds owner of the island. Near the village the nunnery named Bethlehem was located.

=== Protestant church ===
In 1889 a Protestant church was built on the same location as the monastery.

The poet Jan Boer was born in Rottum. In 1999 the sculptor Greet Grottendieck was asked to make a bust of Jan Boer to celebrate the 100th anniversary of his day of birth.

== Gallery ==
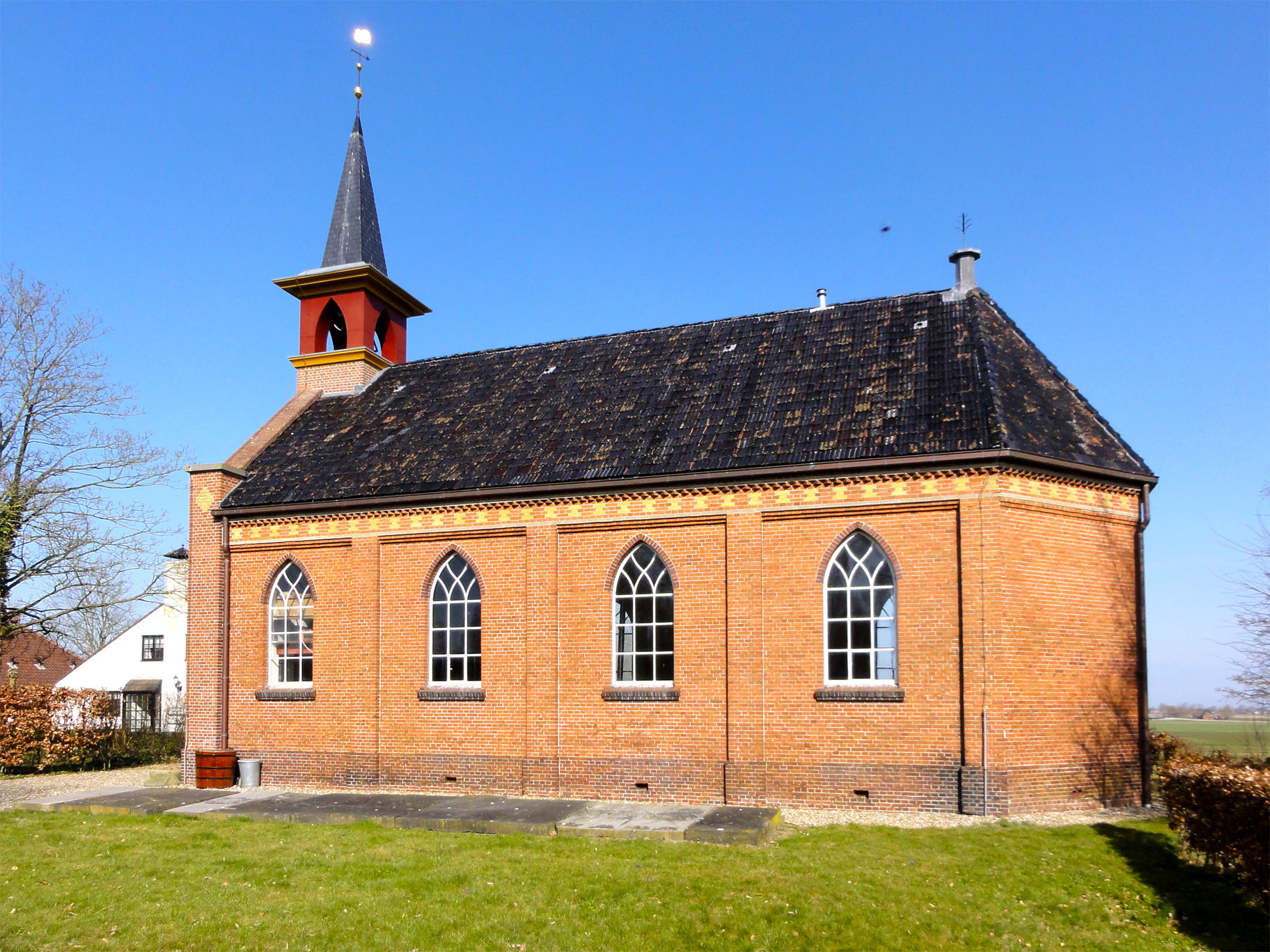
Church of Rottum

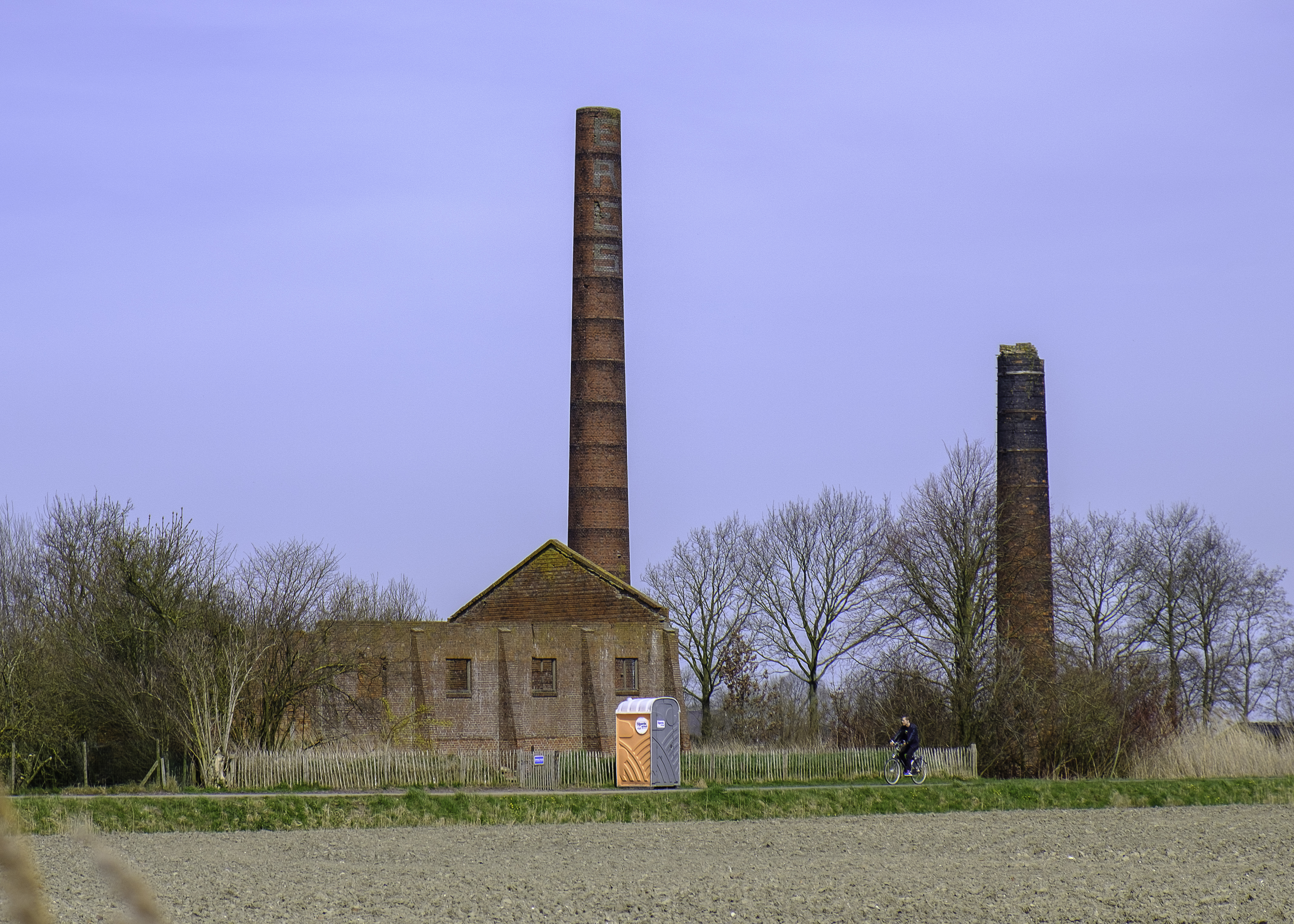
Former brick works

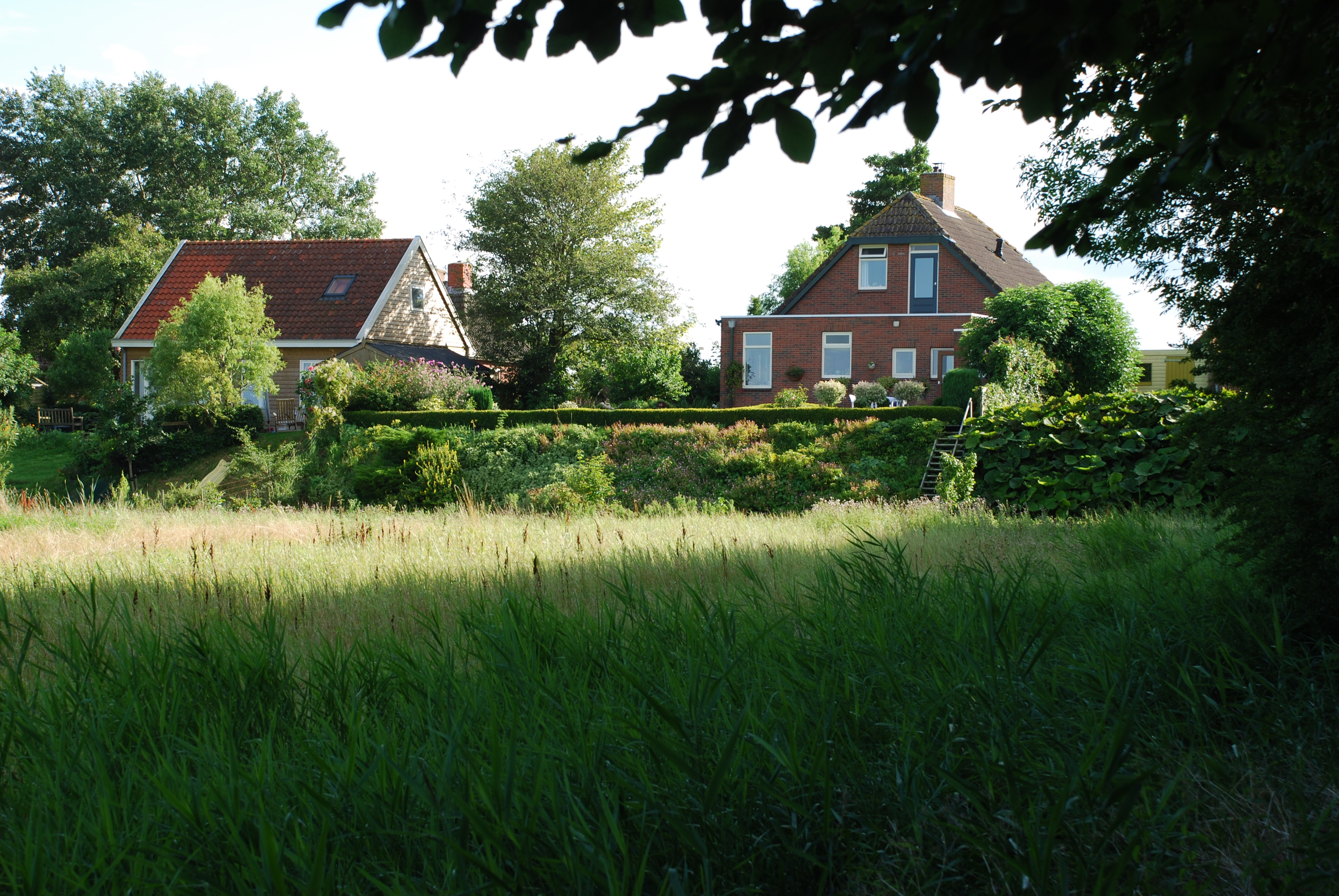
Excavated terp

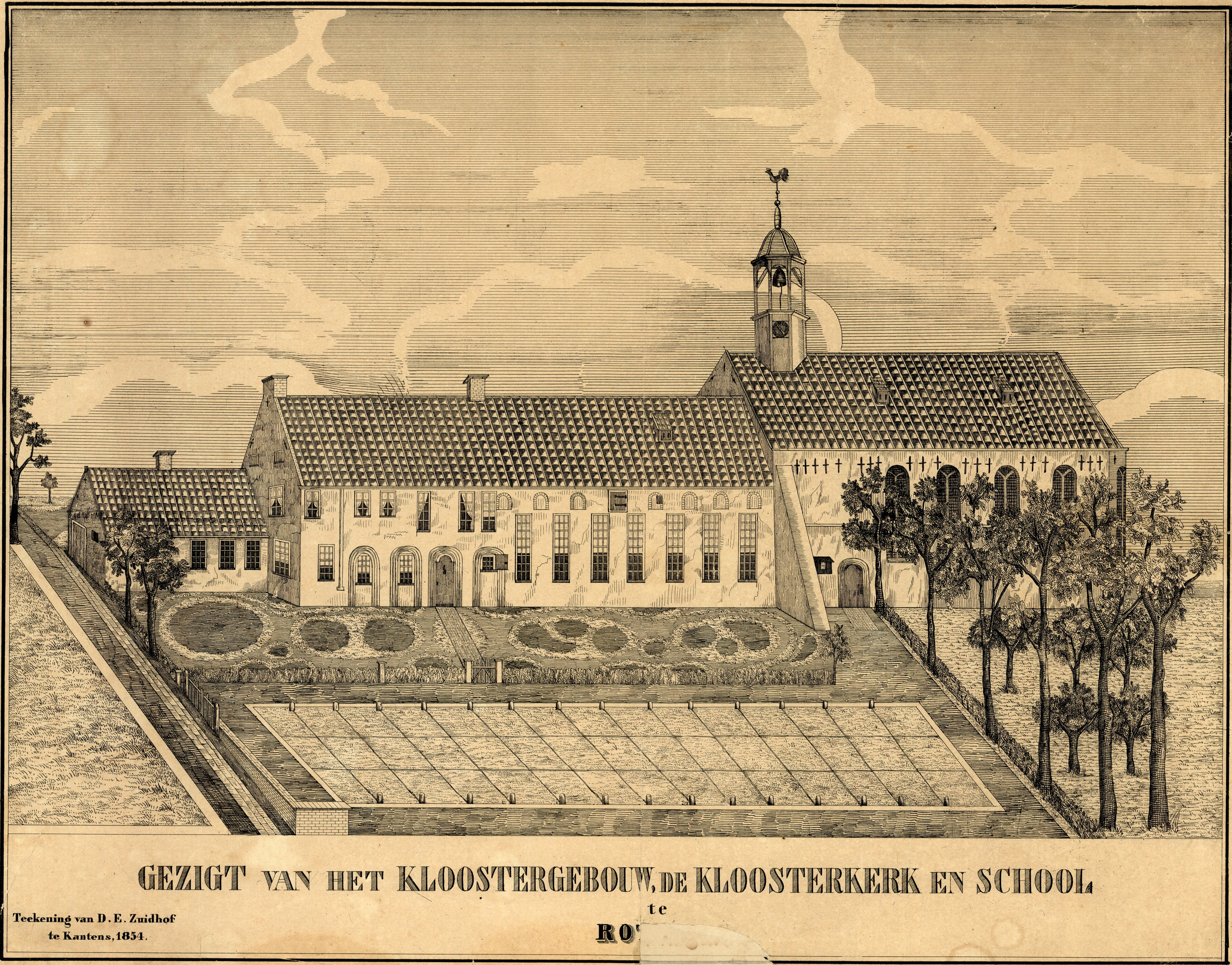
View on the monastery (1854)
