= December 5 =

December 5 this year in various calendars
- Saturday, 5 December 2026
Akan	Kwamemene
Armenian	18 Kʿaloch 1476
Aztec	Tozoztontli 4, 5 Ōlīn
Babylonian	24 Arakhsamna, 2337 SE
Balinese pawukon	Menga, Beteng, Jaya, Umanis, Was, Saniscara of Taulu, Guru, Ogan, Sri
Bengali	20 Ogrohayon, BS 1433
Chinese	Yin Water Ox・Willow Mansion; Fire Horse Year, Month 10, Day 27 (Xiaoxue, 2 days until Daxue)
Common Era	5 December 2026 CE
Coptic	26 Hathor, AM 1743
Egyptian	23 Pharmuthi, 2775 NE
Ethiopian	26 H̱edār, 2019 Amätä Məhrät
French Republican	Décade II, Quartidi de Frimaire de l'Année 235 de la République
Gregorian	5 December, AD 2026
Hebrew	25 Kislev, AM 5787
Hindu	Citrā・Saubhāgya; Solar: 19 Mārgaśīrṣa, 1948 SE; Lunisolar: Dvādaśī, Kṛishna pakṣa of Kārtika, 2083 VE; Rāudra・5127 KY・1,872,914
Icelandic	Laugardagur, 13 Ýlir 2026
Islamic	24 Jumada al-thani, AH 1448 (using tabular method)
ISO week date	2026-W49-6
Japanese	27 Kannazuki, Reiwa 8 (Shōsetsu, 2 days until Taisetsu)
Julian	22 November, AD 2026 (AM 7535)
Julian day	2461380
Korean	27 Dwaejidal, 4359 DE
Maya	13.0.14.2.17; 10 Mac, 5 Caban
Roman	ante diem X Kalendas Decembres, MMDCCLXXIX AUC
Solar Hijri	14 Azar, SH 1405
Tibetan	27 smin drug, me pho rta 2153 or 1772 or 1000

<<	December					>>
Su	Mo	Tu	We	Th	Fr	Sa
		1	2	3	4	5
6	7	8	9	10	11	12
13	14	15	16	17	18	19
20	21	22	23	24	25	26
27	28	29	30	31
2026

December 5 in recent years
2025 (Friday)
2024 (Thursday)
2023 (Tuesday)
2022 (Monday)
2021 (Sunday)
2020 (Saturday)
2019 (Thursday)
2018 (Wednesday)
2017 (Tuesday)
2016 (Monday)

December 5 is the 339th day of the year (340th in leap years) in the Gregorian calendar; 26 days remain until the end of the year.

== Events ==
=== Pre-1600 ===
- 63 BC – Cicero gives the fourth and final of the Catiline Orations.
- 633 – Fourth Council of Toledo opens, presided over by Isidore of Seville.
- 1033 – The Jordan Rift Valley earthquake destroys multiple cities across the Levant, triggers a tsunami and kills many.
- 1082 – Ramon Berenguer II, Count of Barcelona is assassinated, most likely by his brother, Berenguer Ramon II.
- 1408 – Seeking to resubjugate Muscovy, Emir Edigu of the Golden Horde reaches Moscow, burning areas around the city but failing to take the city itself.
- 1456 – The first of two earthquakes measuring M_{w} 7.2 strikes Italy, causing extreme destruction and killing upwards of 70,000 people.
- 1484 – Pope Innocent VIII issues the Summis desiderantes affectibus, a papal bull that deputizes Heinrich Kramer and Jacob Sprenger as inquisitors to root out alleged witchcraft in Germany.
- 1496 – King Manuel I of Portugal issues a decree ordering the expulsion of Jews from the country.
- 1560 – Ten-year-old Charles IX becomes king of France, with Queen Mother Catherine de' Medici as regent.
- 1578 – Sir Francis Drake, after sailing through Strait of Magellan, raids Valparaíso.

=== 1601–1900 ===
- 1649 – The town of Raahe (Swedish: Brahestad) is founded by Count Per Brahe the Younger.
- 1757 – Seven Years' War: Battle of Leuthen: Frederick II of Prussia leads Prussian forces to a decisive victory over Austrian forces under Prince Charles Alexander of Lorraine.
- 1766 – In London, auctioneer James Christie holds his first sale.
- 1770 – 29th Regiment of Foot privates Hugh Montgomery and Matthew Kilroy are found guilty for the manslaughter of Crispus Attucks and Samuel Gray respectively in the Boston Massacre.
- 1775 – At Fort Ticonderoga, Henry Knox begins his historic transport of artillery to Cambridge, Massachusetts.
- 1776 – Phi Beta Kappa, the oldest academic honor society in the U.S., holds its first meeting at the College of William & Mary.
- 1831 – Former U.S. President John Quincy Adams takes his seat in the House of Representatives.
- 1847 – Jefferson Davis is elected to the U.S. Senate.
- 1848 – California Gold Rush: In a message to the United States Congress, U.S. President James K. Polk confirms that large amounts of gold had been discovered in California.
- 1865 – Chincha Islands War: Peru allies with Chile against Spain.
- 1895 – New Haven Symphony Orchestra of Connecticut performs its first concert.

=== 1901–present ===
- 1914 – The Imperial Trans-Antarctic Expedition begins in an attempt to make the first land crossing of Antarctica.
- 1919 – Ukrainian War of Independence: The Polonsky conspiracy is suppressed and its participants are executed by the Kontrrazvedka.
- 1921 – The Football Association bans women's football in England from league grounds, a ban that stays in place for 50 years.
- 1933 – The Twenty-first Amendment to the United States Constitution is ratified, repealing Prohibition in the United States.
- 1934 – Abyssinia Crisis: Italian troops attack Wal Wal in Abyssinia, taking four days to capture the city.
- 1935 – Mary McLeod Bethune founds the National Council of Negro Women in New York City.
- 1936 – The Soviet Union adopts a new constitution and the Kirghiz Soviet Socialist Republic is established as a full Union Republic of the USSR.
- 1941 – World War II: In the Battle of Moscow, Georgy Zhukov launches a massive Soviet counter-attack against the German army.
- 1941 – World War II: Great Britain declares war on Finland, Hungary and Romania.
- 1943 – World War II: Allied air forces begin attacking Germany's secret weapons bases in Operation Crossbow.
- 1945 – Flight 19, a group of TBF Avengers, disappears in the Bermuda Triangle.
- 1952 – Beginning of the Great Smog in London. A cold fog combines with air pollution and brings the city to a standstill for four days. Later, a Ministry of Health report estimates 4,000 fatalities as a result of it.
- 1955 – The American Federation of Labor and the Congress of Industrial Organizations merge and form the AFL–CIO.
- 1955 – The Civil Rights Movement: the Montgomery bus boycott begins, led by E. D. Nixon and Rosa Parks.
- 1958 – Subscriber Trunk Dialling (STD) is inaugurated in the United Kingdom by Queen Elizabeth II when she speaks to the Lord Provost in a call from Bristol to Edinburgh.
- 1958 – The Preston By-pass, the UK's first stretch of motorway, opens to traffic for the first time. (It is now part of the M6 and M55 motorways.)
- 1964 – Vietnam War: For his heroism in battle earlier in the year, Captain Roger Donlon is awarded the first Medal of Honor of the war.
- 1964 – Lloyd J. Old discovers the first linkage between the major histocompatibility complex (MHC) and disease—mouse leukemia—opening the way for the recognition of the importance of the MHC in the immune response.
- 1971 – Battle of Gazipur: Pakistani forces are defeated as India cedes Gazipur to Bangladesh.
- 1977 – Egypt breaks diplomatic relations with Syria, Libya, Algeria, Iraq and South Yemen in retaliation to preventing President Anwar el-Sadat from pursuing negotiations with Israel at the Tripoli confer.
- 1983 – Dissolution of the Military Junta in Argentina.
- 1991 – Leonid Kravchuk is elected the first president of Ukraine.
- 1994 – The Budapest Memorandum is signed at the OSCE conference in Budapest, Hungary.
- 1995 – Sri Lankan Civil War: Sri Lanka's government announces the conquest of the Tamil stronghold of Jaffna.
- 1995 – Azerbaijan Airlines Flight A-56 crashes near Nakhchivan International Airport in Nakhchivan, Azerbaijan, killing 52 people.
- 2001 – Space Shuttle Endeavour launches on STS-108, carrying the Expedition 4 crew to the International Space Station.
- 2005 – The Civil Partnership Act comes into effect in the United Kingdom, and the first civil partnership is registered there.
- 2005 – The 6.8 M_{w} Lake Tanganyika earthquake shakes the eastern provinces of the Democratic Republic of the Congo with a maximum Mercalli intensity of X (Extreme), killing six people.
- 2006 – Commodore Frank Bainimarama overthrows the government in Fiji.
- 2007 – Westroads Mall shooting: Nineteen-year-old Robert A. Hawkins kills nine people, including himself, with a WASR-10 at a Von Maur department store in Omaha, Nebraska.
- 2013 – Militants attack a Defense Ministry compound in Sanaa, Yemen, killing at least 56 people and injuring 200 others.
- 2014 – Exploration Flight Test-1, the first flight test of Orion, is launched.
- 2017 – The International Olympic Committee bans Russia from competing at the 2018 Winter Olympics for doping at the 2014 Winter Olympics.

== Births ==
=== Pre-1600 ===
- 852 – Zhu Wen, Chinese emperor (died 912)
- 1377 – Jianwen Emperor of China (died 1402)
- 1389 – Zbigniew Oleśnicki, Polish cardinal and statesman (died 1455)
- 1443 – Pope Julius II (died 1513)
- 1470 – Willibald Pirckheimer, German lawyer and author (died 1530)
- 1495 – Nicolas Cleynaerts, Flemish philologist and lexicographer (died 1542)
- 1537 – Ashikaga Yoshiaki, Japanese shōgun (died 1597)
- 1539 – Fausto Sozzini, Italian theologian and author (died 1604)
- 1547 – Ubbo Emmius, Dutch historian and geographer (died 1625)
- 1556 – Anne Cecil, Countess of Oxford, English countess (died 1588)
- 1596 – Henry Lawes, English composer (died 1662)

=== 1601–1900 ===
- 1661 – Robert Harley, 1st Earl of Oxford and Earl Mortimer, English lawyer and politician, Secretary of State for the Northern Department (died 1724)
- 1666 – Francesco Scarlatti, Italian violinist and composer (died 1741)
- 1687 – Francesco Geminiani, Italian violinist and composer (died 1762)
- 1697 – Giuseppe de Majo, Italian organist and composer (died 1771)
- 1782 – Martin Van Buren, American lawyer and politician, 8th President of the United States (died 1862)
- 1784 – George Shepherd, English illustrator and painter (died 1862)
- 1803 – Fyodor Tyutchev, Russian poet and diplomat (died 1873)
- 1820 – Afanasy Fet, Russian poet and author (died 1892)
- 1822 – Elizabeth Cabot Agassiz, American philosopher and academic, co-founded Radcliffe College (died 1907)
- 1829 – Henri-Gustave Joly de Lotbinière, French-Canadian lawyer and politician, 4th Premier of Quebec (died 1908)
- 1830 – Christina Rossetti, English poet and author (died 1894)
- 1839 – George Armstrong Custer, American general (died 1876)
- 1841 – Marcus Daly, Irish-American businessman (died 1900)
- 1849 – Eduard Seler, German anthropologist, ethnohistorian, linguist, and academic (died 1922)
- 1855 – Clinton Hart Merriam, American zoologist, ornithologist, entomologist, and ethnographer (died 1942)
- 1859 – John Jellicoe, 1st Earl Jellicoe, English admiral and politician, 2nd Governor-General of New Zealand (died 1935)
- 1861 – Konstantin Korovin, Russian-French painter and set designer (died 1939)
- 1862 – John Henry Leech, English entomologist (died 1900)
- 1863 – Paul Painlevé, French mathematician and politician, 84th Prime Minister of France (died 1933)
- 1866 – John Beresford, Irish polo player (died 1944)
- 1866 – Traian Demetrescu, Romanian poet and author (died 1896)
- 1867 – Antti Aarne, Finnish author and academic (died 1925)
- 1867 – Józef Piłsudski, Polish field marshal and politician, 15th Prime Minister of Poland (died 1935)
- 1868 – Arnold Sommerfeld, German physicist and academic (died 1951)
- 1869 – Ellis Parker Butler, American author and poet (died 1937)
- 1870 – Vítězslav Novák, Czech composer and educator (died 1949)
- 1872 – Harry Nelson Pillsbury, American chess player (died 1906)
- 1875 – Arthur Currie, Canadian general (died 1933)
- 1879 – Clyde Vernon Cessna, American pilot and businessman, founded the Cessna Aircraft Corporation (died 1954)
- 1881 – René Cresté, French actor and director (died 1922)
- 1886 – Rose Wilder Lane, American journalist and author (died 1968)
- 1886 – Pieter Oud, Dutch historian, academic, and politician, Minister of Finance of the Netherlands (died 1968)
- 1886 – Nikolai Uglanov, Soviet politician (died 1937)
- 1888 – Sabás Reyes Salazar, Mexican Catholic priest (died 1927)
- 1890 – David Bomberg, English painter, illustrator, and academic (died 1957)
- 1890 – Fritz Lang, Austrian-American director, producer, and screenwriter (died 1976)
- 1891 – Paul Kogerman, Estonian chemist and academic (died 1951)
- 1894 – Charles Robberts Swart, South African lawyer and politician, 1st State President of South Africa (died 1982)
- 1895 – Elbert Frank Cox, American mathematician and academic (died 1969)
- 1896 – Ann Nolan Clark, American historian, author, and educator (died 1995)
- 1896 – Carl Ferdinand Cori, Czech-American biochemist and pharmacologist, Nobel Prize laureate (died 1984)
- 1897 – Nunnally Johnson, American director, producer, and screenwriter (died 1977)
- 1897 – Gershom Scholem, German-Israeli philosopher and historian (died 1982)
- 1898 – Josh Malihabadi, Indian-Pakistani poet and translator (died 1982)
- 1898 – Grace Moore, American soprano and actress (died 1947)
- 1900 – Jimmy Dimmock, English footballer (died 1972)

=== 1901–present ===
- 1901 – Walt Disney, American animator, director, producer, and screenwriter, co-founded The Walt Disney Company (died 1966)
- 1901 – Milton H. Erickson, American psychiatrist and author (died 1980)
- 1901 – Werner Heisenberg, German physicist and academic, Nobel Prize laureate (died 1976)
- 1902 – Emeric Pressburger, Hungarian-English director, producer, and screenwriter (died 1988)
- 1902 – Strom Thurmond, American educator, general, and politician, 103rd Governor of South Carolina (died 2003)
- 1903 – Johannes Heesters, Dutch-German actor and singer (died 2011)
- 1903 – C. F. Powell, English-Italian physicist and academic, Nobel Prize laureate (died 1969)
- 1905 – Francisco Javier Arana, Guatemalan Army colonel and briefly Guatemalan head of state (died 1949)
- 1905 – Otto Preminger, Austrian-American actor, director, and producer (died 1986)
- 1907 – Lin Biao, Chinese general and politician, 2nd Vice Premier of the People's Republic of China (died 1971)
- 1907 – Giuseppe Occhialini, Italian-French physicist and academic (died 1993)
- 1910 – Abraham Polonsky, American director and screenwriter (died 1999)
- 1911 – Władysław Szpilman, Polish pianist and composer (died 2000)
- 1912 – Kate Simon, American travel writer (died 1990)
- 1912 – Sonny Boy Williamson II, American singer-songwriter and harmonica player (died 1965)
- 1913 – Esther Borja, Cuban soprano and actress (died 2013)
- 1913 – Bruce Conde, American army officer, mercenary, stamp collector, and royalty claimant (died 1992)
- 1914 – Helen Dettweiler, American golfer (died 1990)
- 1914 – Hans Hellmut Kirst, German lieutenant and author (died 1989)
- 1916 – Hilary Koprowski, Polish-American virologist and immunologist, created the world's first effective live polio vaccine (died 2013)
- 1916 – Walt McPherson, American basketball player and coach (died 2013)
- 1917 – Ken Downing, English racing driver (died 2004)
- 1919 – Alun Gwynne Jones, Baron Chalfont, English historian and politician (died 2020)
- 1921 – Alvy Moore, American actor and producer (died 1997)
- 1922 – Casey Ribicoff, American philanthropist (died 2011)
- 1922 – Don Robertson, American songwriter and pianist (died 2015)
- 1924 – Robert Sobukwe, South African banker and politician (died 1978)
- 1925 – Anastasio Somoza Debayle, Nicaraguan politician, 73rd President of Nicaragua (died 1980)
- 1926 – Adetoun Ogunsheye, first female Nigerian professor and university dean
- 1927 – Bhumibol Adulyadej, King of Thailand (died 2016)
- 1927 – W.D. Amaradeva, Sri Lankan musician and composer (died 2016)
- 1929 – Madis Kõiv, Estonian physicist, philosopher, and author (died 2014)
- 1930 – Yi-Fu Tuan, Chinese-American geographer (died 2022)
- 1931 – Ladislav Novák, Czech footballer and manager (died 2011)
- 1932 – Alf Dubs, Baron Dubs, British politician
- 1932 – Sheldon Glashow, American physicist and academic, Nobel Prize laureate
- 1932 – Jim Hurtubise, American race car driver (died 1989)
- 1932 – Nadira, Indian actress (died 2006)
- 1932 – Little Richard, American singer-songwriter, pianist, and actor (died 2020)
- 1933 – Gennadiy Agapov, Russian race walker (died 1999)
- 1933 – Harry Holgate, Australian politician, 36th Premier of Tasmania (died 1997)
- 1934 – Joan Didion, American novelist and screenwriter (died 2021)
- 1935 – Calvin Trillin, American novelist, humorist, and journalist
- 1935 – Yury Vlasov, Ukrainian-Russian weightlifter and politician (died 2021)
- 1936 – James Lee Burke, American journalist, author, and academic
- 1938 – J. J. Cale, American singer-songwriter and guitarist (died 2013)
- 1940 – Tony Crafter, Australian cricket umpire
- 1940 – Boris Ignatyev, Russian footballer and manager (died 2026)
- 1940 – Peter Pohl, Swedish author, director, and screenwriter
- 1940 – Frank Wilson, American singer-songwriter and producer (died 2012)
- 1942 – Bryan Murray, Canadian ice hockey coach (died 2017)
- 1943 – Eva Joly, Norwegian-French judge and politician
- 1943 – Andrew Yeom Soo-jung, South Korean cardinal
- 1944 – Jeroen Krabbé, Dutch actor, director, and producer
- 1945 – Serge Chapleau, Canadian cartoonist
- 1945 – Moshe Katsav, Iranian-Israeli educator and politician, 8th President of Israel
- 1946 – José Carreras, Spanish tenor and actor
- 1946 – Andy Kim, Canadian pop singer-songwriter
- 1946 – Sarel van der Merwe, South African racing driver
- 1947 – Rudy Fernandez, Filipino triathlete (died 2022)
- 1947 – Bruce Golding, Jamaican lawyer and politician, 8th Prime Minister of Jamaica
- 1947 – Tony Gregory, Irish activist and politician (died 2009)
- 1947 – Jügderdemidiin Gürragchaa, Mongolian cosmonaut and military leader
- 1947 – Jim Messina, American singer-songwriter, guitarist, and producer
- 1947 – Jim Plunkett, American football player and radio host
- 1947 – Kim Simmonds, Welsh blues-rock singer-songwriter, guitarist, and producer (died 2022)
- 1947 – Don Touhig, Welsh journalist and politician
- 1948 – Denise Drysdale, Australian television host and actress
- 1949 – John Altman, English composer and conductor
- 1949 – David Manning, English civil servant and diplomat, British Ambassador to the United States
- 1951 – Morgan Brittany, American actress
- 1951 – Link Byfield, Canadian journalist and author (died 2015)
- 1951 – Anne-Mie van Kerckhoven, Belgian painter and illustrator
- 1953 – Gwen Lister, South African-Namibian journalist, publisher, and activist
- 1954 – Hanif Kureishi, English author and playwright
- 1955 – Miyuki Kawanaka, Japanese singer
- 1955 – Juha Tiainen, Finnish hammer thrower (died 2003)
- 1956 – Klaus Allofs, German footballer and manager
- 1956 – Butch Lee, Puerto Rican basketball player
- 1956 – Adam Thorpe, French-English author, poet, and playwright
- 1956 – Krystian Zimerman, Polish virtuoso pianist
- 1957 – Raquel Argandoña, Chilean model, actress, and politician
- 1957 – Art Monk, American football player
- 1958 – Dynamite Kid, English wrestler (died 2018)
- 1959 – Lee Chapman, English footballer
- 1959 – Oleksandr Yaroslavsky, Ukrainian businessman
- 1960 – Frans Adelaar, Dutch footballer and manager
- 1960 – Osvaldo Golijov, Argentinian-American composer and educator
- 1960 – Jack Russell, American singer-songwriter and producer (died 2024)
- 1960 – Matthew Taylor, English businessman and politician
- 1961 – Ralf Dujmovits, German mountaineer
- 1961 – Laura Flanders, British journalist
- 1962 – José Cura, Argentinian tenor, conductor, and director
- 1962 – Pablo Morales, American swimmer and coach
- 1962 – Nivek Ogre, Canadian singer-songwriter
- 1962 – Fred Rutten, Dutch footballer and manager
- 1963 – Doctor Dré, American television and radio host
- 1963 – Carrie Hamilton, American actress and playwright (died 2002)
- 1963 – Alberto Nisman, Argentinian lawyer (died 2015)
- 1964 – Martin Vinnicombe, Australian cyclist
- 1965 – Manish Malhotra, Indian fashion designer
- 1965 – John Rzeznik, American singer-songwriter, guitarist, and producer
- 1965 – Wayne Smith, Jamaican rapper (died 2014)
- 1965 – Valeriy Spitsyn, Russian race walker
- 1967 – Gary Allan, American singer-songwriter and guitarist
- 1968 – Margaret Cho, American comedian, actress, producer, and screenwriter
- 1968 – Lisa Marie, American model and actress
- 1968 – Lydia Millet, American novelist
- 1968 – Falilat Ogunkoya, Nigerian sprinter
- 1969 – Eric Etebari, American actor, director, and producer
- 1969 – Morgan J. Freeman, American director, producer, and screenwriter
- 1969 – Sajid Javid, British Pakistani banker and politician, former Chancellor of the Exchequer
- 1969 – Lewis Pugh, English swimmer and lawyer
- 1969 – Ramón Ramírez, Mexican footballer
- 1969 – Catherine Tate, English actress, comedian, and writer
- 1970 – Kevin Haller, Canadian ice hockey player
- 1970 – Michel'le, American singer-songwriter
- 1971 – Karl-Theodor zu Guttenberg, German businessman and politician, German Federal Minister of Defence
- 1971 – Ashia Hansen, American-English triple jumper
- 1971 – Gabriel Hjertstedt, Swedish golfer
- 1971 – Kali Rocha, American actress
- 1972 – Cliff Floyd, American baseball player and sportscaster
- 1972 – Duane Ross, American hurdler and coach
- 1973 – Argo Arbeiter, Estonian footballer
- 1973 – Arik Benado, Israeli footballer
- 1973 – Mikelangelo Loconte, Italian singer-songwriter, producer, and actor
- 1973 – Luboš Motl, Czech physicist and academic
- 1974 – Ravish Kumar, Indian journalist and author
- 1974 – Brian Lewis, American sprinter
- 1975 – Ronnie O'Sullivan, English snooker player and radio host
- 1975 – Paula Patton, American actress
- 1976 – Amy Acker, American actress
- 1976 – Xavier Garbajosa, French rugby player
- 1976 – Norishige Kanai, Japanese doctor and astronaut
- 1976 – Sachiko Kokubu, Japanese actress and model
- 1976 – Rachel Komisarz, American swimmer and coach
- 1977 – Peter van der Vlag, Dutch footballer
- 1978 – Neil Druckmann, American video game designer and author
- 1978 – Olli Jokinen, Finnish ice hockey player
- 1978 – Marcelo Zalayeta, Uruguayan footballer
- 1979 – Matteo Ferrari, Italian footballer
- 1979 – Niklas Hagman, Finnish ice hockey player
- 1979 – Gareth McAuley, Northern Irish footballer
- 1979 – Nick Stahl, American actor
- 1980 – Jessica Paré, Canadian actress
- 1981 – Adan Canto, Mexican actor (died 2024)
- 1982 – Eddy Curry, American basketball player
- 1982 – Keri Hilson, American singer-songwriter and actress
- 1982 – Gabriel Luna, American actor
- 1983 – Joakim Lindström, Swedish ice hockey player
- 1984 – Lauren London, American actress
- 1985 – Shikhar Dhawan, Indian cricketer
- 1985 – André-Pierre Gignac, French footballer
- 1985 – Latifa bint Mohammed Al Maktoum, Emirati princess
- 1985 – Frankie Muniz, American actor, drummer, and race car driver
- 1985 – Josh Smith, American basketball player
- 1985 – Danny Wicks, Australian rugby league player
- 1986 – LeGarrette Blount, American football player
- 1986 – James Hinchcliffe, Canadian Indycar racing driver
- 1986 – Justin Smoak, American baseball player
- 1987 – A. J. Pollock, American baseball player
- 1988 – Ross Bagley, American actor
- 1988 – Tina Charles, American basketball player
- 1988 – Kyle Long, American football player
- 1988 – Joanna Rowsell, English cyclist
- 1989 – Jurrell Casey, American football player
- 1989 – Kwon Yu-ri, South Korean singer-songwriter and actress
- 1990 – Montee Ball, American football player
- 1991 – Cam Fowler, Canadian-American ice hockey player
- 1991 – Christian Yelich, American baseball player
- 1992 – Natalie Sourisseau, Canadian field hockey player
- 1993 – Ross Barkley, English footballer
- 1993 – Luciano Vietto, Argentine footballer
- 1994 – Ondrej Duda, Slovak footballer
- 1994 – Semi Ojeleye, American basketball player
- 1995 – Danny Levi, New Zealand rugby league player
- 1995 – Anthony Martial, French footballer
- 1995 – Kaetlyn Osmond, Canadian figure skater
- 1995 – Levy Rozman, American chess International Master, streamer and YouTuber
- 1995 – Alexander Sørloth, Norwegian footballer
- 1997 – Maddie Poppe, American singer-songwriter and musician
- 1997 – Quinnen Williams, American football player
- 1998 – Conan Gray, American singer-songwriter
- 1998 – Randal Kolo Muani, French footballer
- 2000 – Soobin, South Korean singer-songwriter
- 2008 – Ediz Gürel, Turkish chess grandmaster
- 2009 – Owen Cooper, English actor

== Deaths ==
=== Pre-1600 ===
- 63 BC – Publius Cornelius Lentulus Sura, Roman politician (born 114 BC)
- 334 – Li Ban, emperor of Cheng Han (born 288)
- 902 – Ealhswith, queen consort and wife of Alfred the Great, King of Wessex
- 1082 – Ramon Berenguer II, Count of Barcelona (born 1053)
- 1212 – Dirk van Are, bishop and lord of Utrecht
- 1244 – Joan, Countess of Flanders and Hainault (born 1199 or 1200)
- 1355 – John III, Duke of Brabant (born 1300)
- 1560 – Francis II of France (born 1544)
- 1570 – Johan Friis, Danish politician (born 1494)

=== 1601–1900 ===
- 1624 – Gaspard Bauhin, Swiss botanist and physician (born 1560)
- 1654 – Jean François Sarrazin, French author and poet (born 1611)
- 1663 – Severo Bonini, Italian organist and composer (born 1582)
- 1749 – Pierre Gaultier de Varennes, sieur de La Vérendrye, Canadian commander and explorer (born 1685)
- 1758 – Johann Friedrich Fasch, German violinist and composer (born 1688)
- 1770 – James Stirling, Scottish mathematician and surveyor (born 1692)
- 1784 – Phillis Wheatley, Senegal-born slave, later American poet (born 1753)
- 1791 – Wolfgang Amadeus Mozart, Austrian composer and musician (born 1756)
- 1819 – Friedrich Leopold zu Stolberg-Stolberg, German poet and lawyer (born 1750)
- 1854 – Henry Ross, Canadian-Australian gold miner (born 1829)
- 1870 – Alexandre Dumas, French novelist and playwright (born 1802)
- 1887 – Eliza R. Snow, American poet and songwriter (born 1804)
- 1891 – Pedro II of Brazil (born 1825)

=== 1901–present ===
- 1918 – Schalk Willem Burger, South African commander, lawyer, and politician, 6th President of the South African Republic (born 1852)
- 1925 – Władysław Reymont, Polish novelist, Nobel Prize laureate (born 1867)
- 1926 – Claude Monet, French painter (born 1840)
- 1931 – Vachel Lindsay, American poet (born 1879)
- 1933 – Alexander Atabekian, Armenian physician and anarchist publisher (born 1869)
- 1940 – Jan Kubelík, Czech violinist and composer (born 1880)
- 1941 – Amrita Sher-Gil, Hungarian-Pakistani painter (born 1913)
- 1942 – Jock Delves Broughton, English captain (born 1883)
- 1946 – Louis Dewis, Belgian-French painter and educator (born 1872)
- 1951 – Shoeless Joe Jackson, American baseball player and manager (born 1887)
- 1951 – Abanindranath Tagore, Indian painter, author, and academic (born 1871)
- 1953 – William Sterling Parsons, American admiral (born 1901)
- 1955 – Glenn L. Martin, American pilot and businessman, founded the Glenn L. Martin Company (born 1886)
- 1961 – Emil Fuchs, German-American lawyer and businessman (born 1878)
- 1963 – Karl Amadeus Hartmann, German composer and educator (born 1905)
- 1963 – Huseyn Shaheed Suhrawardy, Indian-Pakistani lawyer and politician, 5th Prime Minister of Pakistan (born 1892)
- 1964 – V. Veerasingam, Sri Lankan educator and politician (born 1892)
- 1965 – Joseph Erlanger, American physiologist, neuroscientist, and academic Nobel Prize laureate (born 1874)
- 1968 – Fred Clark, American actor (born 1914)
- 1969 – Claude Dornier, German engineer and businessman, founded Dornier Flugzeugwerke (born 1884)
- 1969 – Princess Alice of Battenberg, mother of Prince Philip of the United Kingdom (born 1885)
- 1973 – Robert Watson-Watt, Scottish engineer, invented the radar (born 1892)
- 1975 – Constance McLaughlin Green, American historian and author (born 1897)
- 1977 – Katherine Milhous, American author and illustrator (born 1894)
- 1977 – Aleksandr Vasilevsky, Russian marshal and politician, Minister of Defence for the Soviet Union (born 1895)
- 1979 – Jesse Pearson, American actor, singer, and screenwriter (born 1930)
- 1983 – Robert Aldrich, American director, producer, and screenwriter (born 1918)
- 1984 – Cecil M. Harden, American politician (born 1894)
- 1986 – Edward Youde, Welsh-Chinese sinologist and diplomat, 26th Governor of Hong Kong (born 1924)
- 1989 – John Pritchard, English conductor and director (born 1921)
- 1990 – Alfonso A. Ossorio, Filipino-American painter and sculptor (born 1916)
- 1991 – Richard Speck, American mass murderer (born 1941)
- 1994 – Harry Horner, Czech-American director, producer, and production designer (born 1910)
- 1995 – L. B. Cole, American illustrator and publisher (born 1918)
- 1995 – Charles Evans, English mountaineer, surgeon, and educator (born 1918)
- 1995 – Gwen Harwood, Australian poet and playwright (born 1920)
- 1995 – Clair Cameron Patterson, American scientist (born 1922)
- 1997 – Eugen Cicero, Romanian-German jazz pianist (born 1940)
- 1998 – Albert Gore, Sr., American lawyer and politician (born 1907)
- 2001 – Franco Rasetti, Italian-American physicist and academic (born 1901)
- 2002 – Roone Arledge, American sportscaster and producer (born 1931)
- 2002 – Ne Win, Burmese general and politician, 4th President of Burma (born 1911)
- 2005 – Edward L. Masry, American lawyer and politician (born 1932)
- 2006 – David Bronstein, Ukrainian-Belarusian chess player and theoretician (born 1924)
- 2007 – Andrew Imbrie, American composer and academic (born 1921)
- 2007 – George Paraskevaides, Greek-Cypriot businessman and philanthropist, co-founded Joannou & Paraskevaides (born 1916)
- 2007 – Karlheinz Stockhausen, German composer and academic (born 1928)
- 2008 – Patriarch Alexy II of Moscow (born 1929)
- 2008 – George Brecht, American chemist and composer (born 1926)
- 2008 – Nina Foch, Dutch-American actress (born 1924)
- 2008 – Beverly Garland, American actress and businesswoman (born 1926)
- 2008 – Anca Parghel, Romanian singer-songwriter and pianist (born 1957)
- 2009 – William Lederer, American soldier and author (born 1912)
- 2010 – Alan Armer, American director, producer, and screenwriter (born 1922)
- 2010 – Don Meredith, American football player, sportscaster, and actor (born 1938)
- 2011 – Peter Gethin, English racing driver (born 1940)
- 2011 – Gennady Logofet, Russian footballer and manager (born 1942)
- 2012 – Dave Brubeck, American pianist and composer (born 1920)
- 2012 – Elisabeth Murdoch, Australian philanthropist (born 1909)
- 2012 – Oscar Niemeyer, Brazilian architect, designed the United Nations Headquarters and Cathedral of Brasília (born 1907)
- 2012 – Ignatius IV of Antioch, Syrian patriarch (born 1920)
- 2013 – Fred Bassetti, American architect and academic, founded Bassetti Architects (born 1917)
- 2013 – William B. Edmondson, American lawyer and diplomat, United States Ambassador to South Africa (born 1927)
- 2013 – Nelson Mandela, South African lawyer and politician, 1st President of South Africa, Nobel Prize laureate (born 1918)
- 2014 – Ernest C. Brace, American captain and pilot (born 1931)
- 2014 – Fabiola, Queen of Belgium (born 1928)
- 2014 – Talât Sait Halman, Turkish poet, translator, and historian (born 1931)
- 2014 – Jackie Healy-Rae, Irish hurdler and politician (born 1931)
- 2014 – Silvio Zavala, Mexican historian and author (born 1909)
- 2015 – Vic Eliason, American clergyman and radio host, founded VCY America (born 1936)
- 2015 – Tibor Rubin, Hungarian-American soldier, Medal of Honor recipient (born 1929)
- 2015 – Chuck Williams, American businessman and author, founded Williams Sonoma (born 1915)
- 2016 – Tyruss Himes ("Big Syke"), American rapper (born 1968)
- 2016 – J. Jayalalithaa, Indian actress and Former Chief Minister of the Indian state of Tamil Nadu (born 1948)
- 2017 – Michael I of Romania, fifth and last king of Romania (born 1921)
- 2017 – August Ames, Canadian American pornographic actress (born 1994)
- 2019 – Robert Walker, American actor (born 1940)
- 2020 – Peter Alliss, English professional golfer (born 1931)
- 2021 – Bob Dole, American politician (born 1923)
- 2022 – Kirstie Alley, American actress and producer (born 1951)
- 2023 – Norman Lear, American screenwriter and producer (born 1922)
- 2024 – Jacques Roubaud, French poet, writer, and mathematician (born 1932)
- 2025 – Frank Gehry, Canadian-American architect and designer (b. 1929)
- 2025 – Michael Annett, American Former NASCAR Driver (b. 1986)

== Holidays and observances ==
- Christian feast day:
  - Clement of Alexandria (Episcopal Church)
  - Crispina of Numidia
  - Dalmatius of Pavia
  - John Almond
  - Justinian of Ramsey Island
  - Nicetius (Nizier)
  - Pelinus of Brindisi
  - Sabbas the Sanctified
  - December 5 (Eastern Orthodox liturgics)
- Children's Day (Suriname)
- Day of Military Honour - Battle of Moscow (Russia)
- Discovery Day (Haiti and Dominican Republic)
- International Volunteer Day for Economic and Social Development
- Klozum (Schiermonnikoog, Netherlands)
- Saint Nicholas' Eve (Belgium, Czech Republic, Slovakia, the Netherlands, Hungary, Romania, Germany, Poland and the UK)
  - Krampusnacht (Austria)
- The King Bhumibol Adulyadej Memorial Birthday (Thailand)
- World Soil Day
