= Moddergat =

- Village
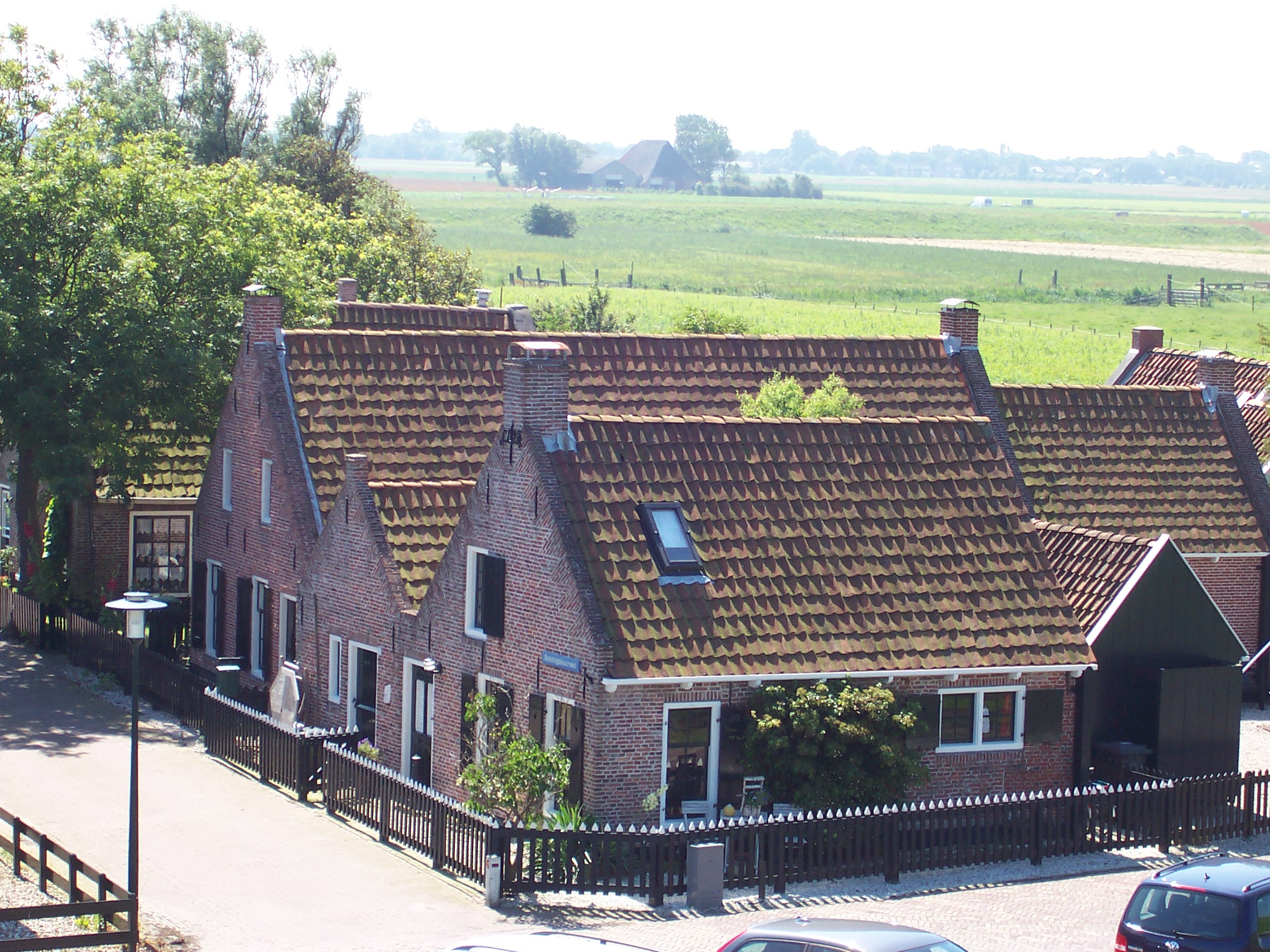
- View from the seaside

- Flag Coat of arms
- Nickname: Blabberpoepert
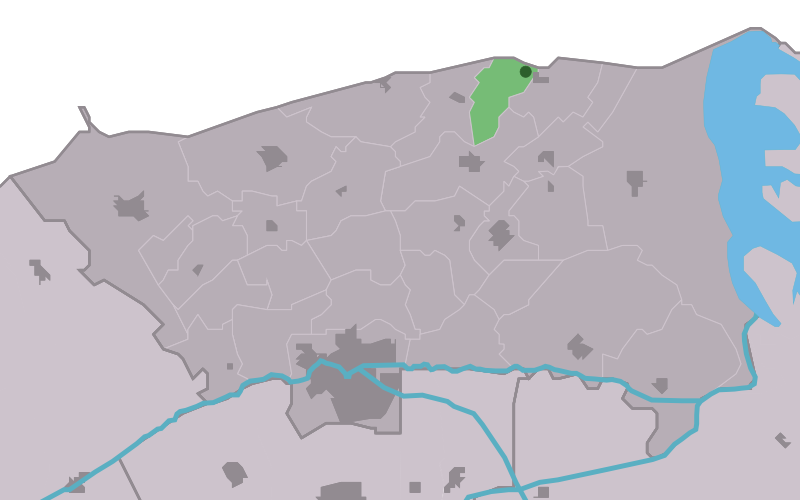
- Location in the former Dongeradeel municipality

- Location in the Netherlands Moddergat (Netherlands)
- Country: Netherlands
- Province: Friesland
- Municipality: Noardeast-Fryslân

Area
  - Total: 1.91 km^{2} (0.74 sq mi)
- Elevation: 1.1 m (3.6 ft)

Population (2021)
  - Total: 235
  - Density: 123/km^{2} (319/sq mi)
- Time zone: UTC+1 (CET)
  - Summer (DST): UTC+2 (CEST)
- Postal code: 9142
- Dialing code: 0519

Moddergat is a fishing village in Noardeast-Fryslân in the province of Friesland, the Netherlands. It had a population of around 221 in January 2017. Before 2019, the village was part of the Dongeradeel municipality.

The name of the village means 'mud hole' in Dutch and in West Frisian. Moddergat is twinned with Peazens, and they are often referred to as "Peazens-Moddergat".

In 1883, 17 of the 22 ships of Moddergat were lost at sea during a storm killing 83 fishermen. In 1958, a monument was placed on the sea dike in their honour.

In 2004, NCRV television organized a competition for most beautiful place in the Netherlands. Moddergat came in second after Weerribben-Wieden National Park.

== History ==
The village was first mentioned in 1718 as Modde gat, and is supposed to mean "muddy pool". The village of Peazens was founded first on the new dike along the Wadden Sea. Moddergat was founded later from Peazens, and used to consist of two hamlets: De Kamp and De Oere. The Reformed Church was built in 1912 with a wooden tower.

In 1840, Moddergat was home to 220 people. Moddergat used to belong to the municipality of Westdongeradeel and Peazens to Oostdongeradeel. In 1983, the municipalities merged.

== Activities ==
Museum 't Fiskershúske consists of four fishermen's houses, the oldest of which is from 1794, and gives a display of the life and history of the fishers in Moddergat.

Moddergat is one of the starting points for wadlopen (mudflat hiking). At low tide, it is possible to walk to the island of Schiermonnikoog. Mudflat hiking is potentially dangerous, and is only allowed under the supervision of a licensed guide.

== Gallery ==
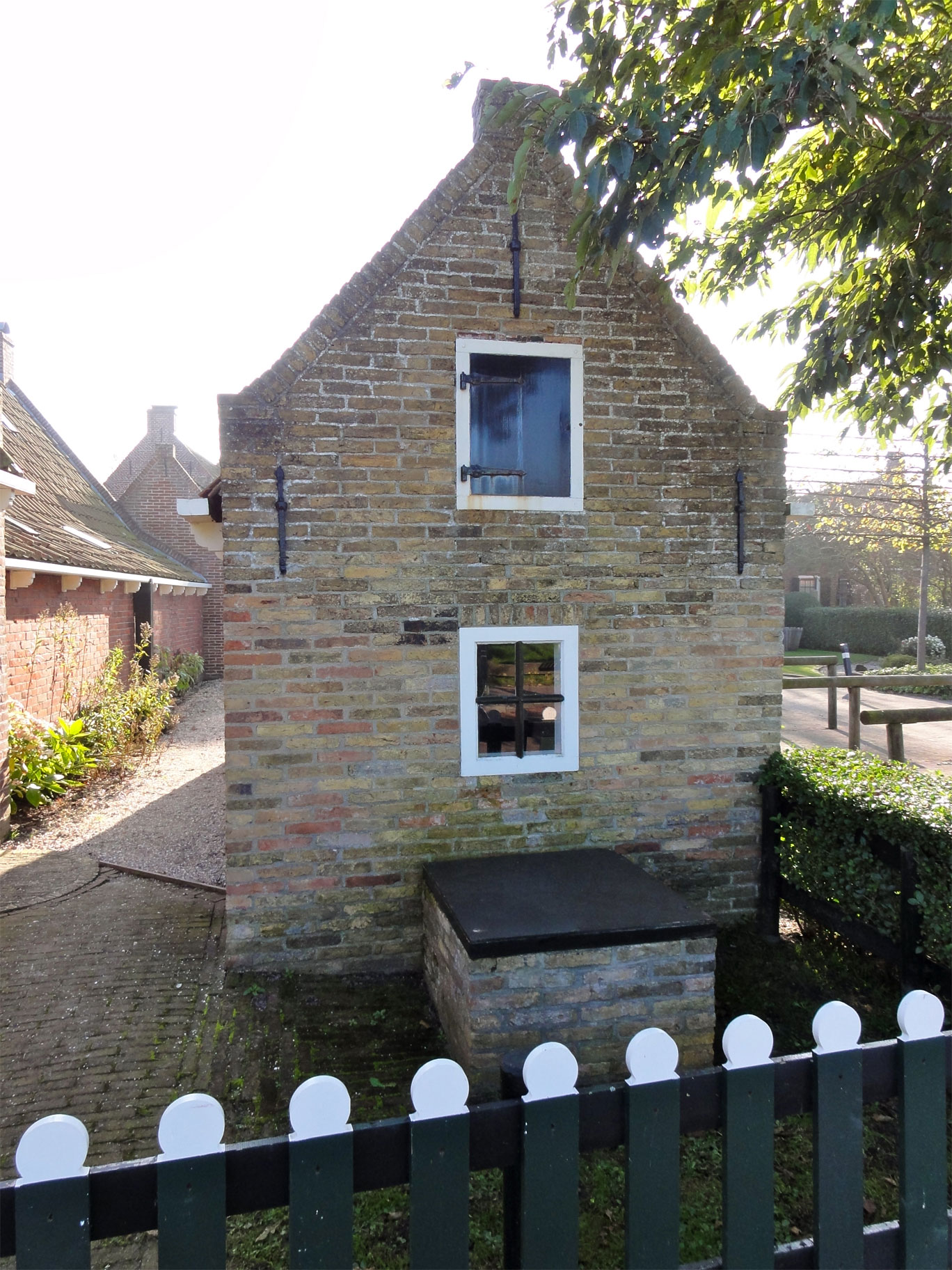
Boethuisje, place to leave the fishing nets

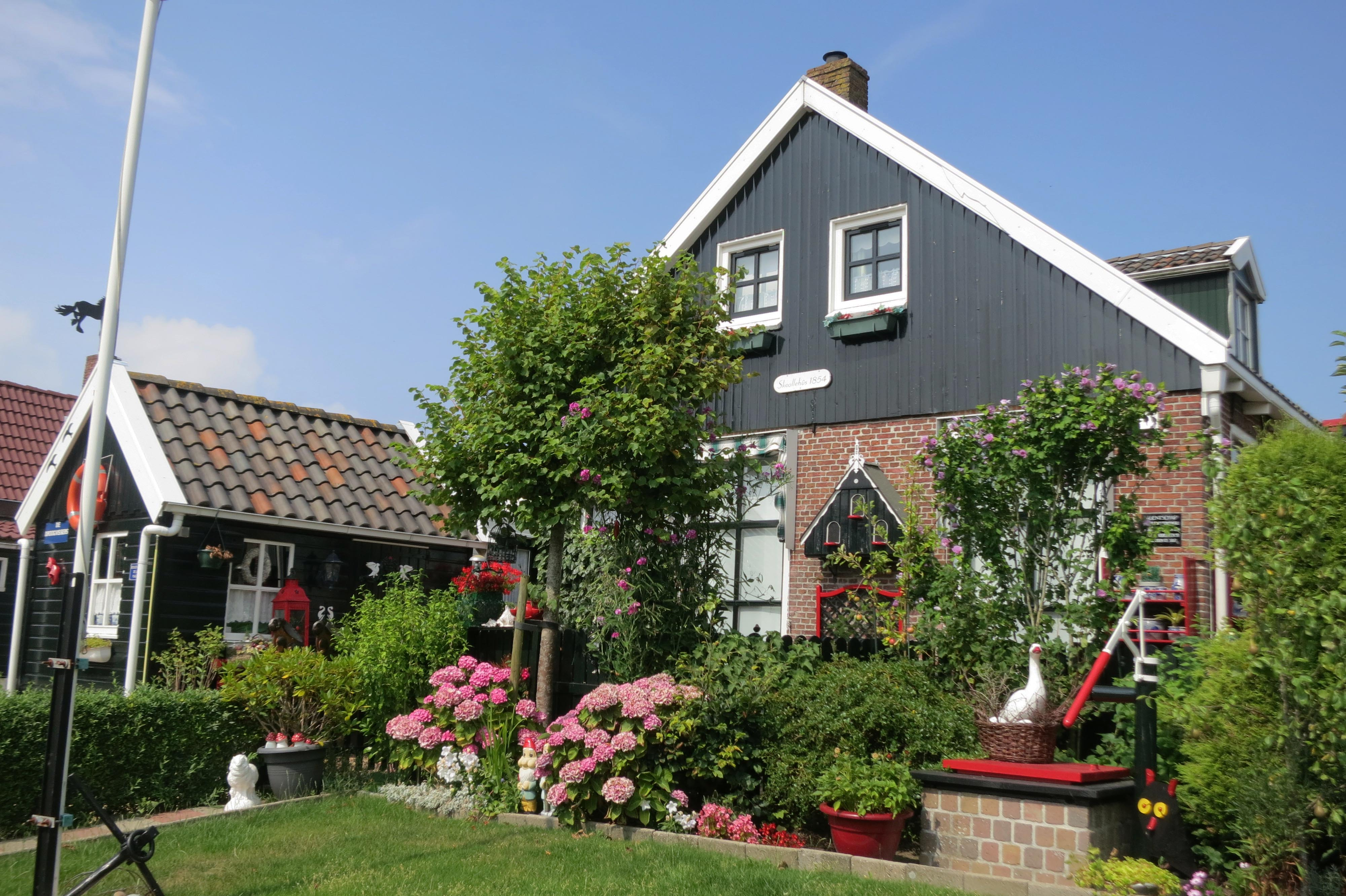
House in Moddergat

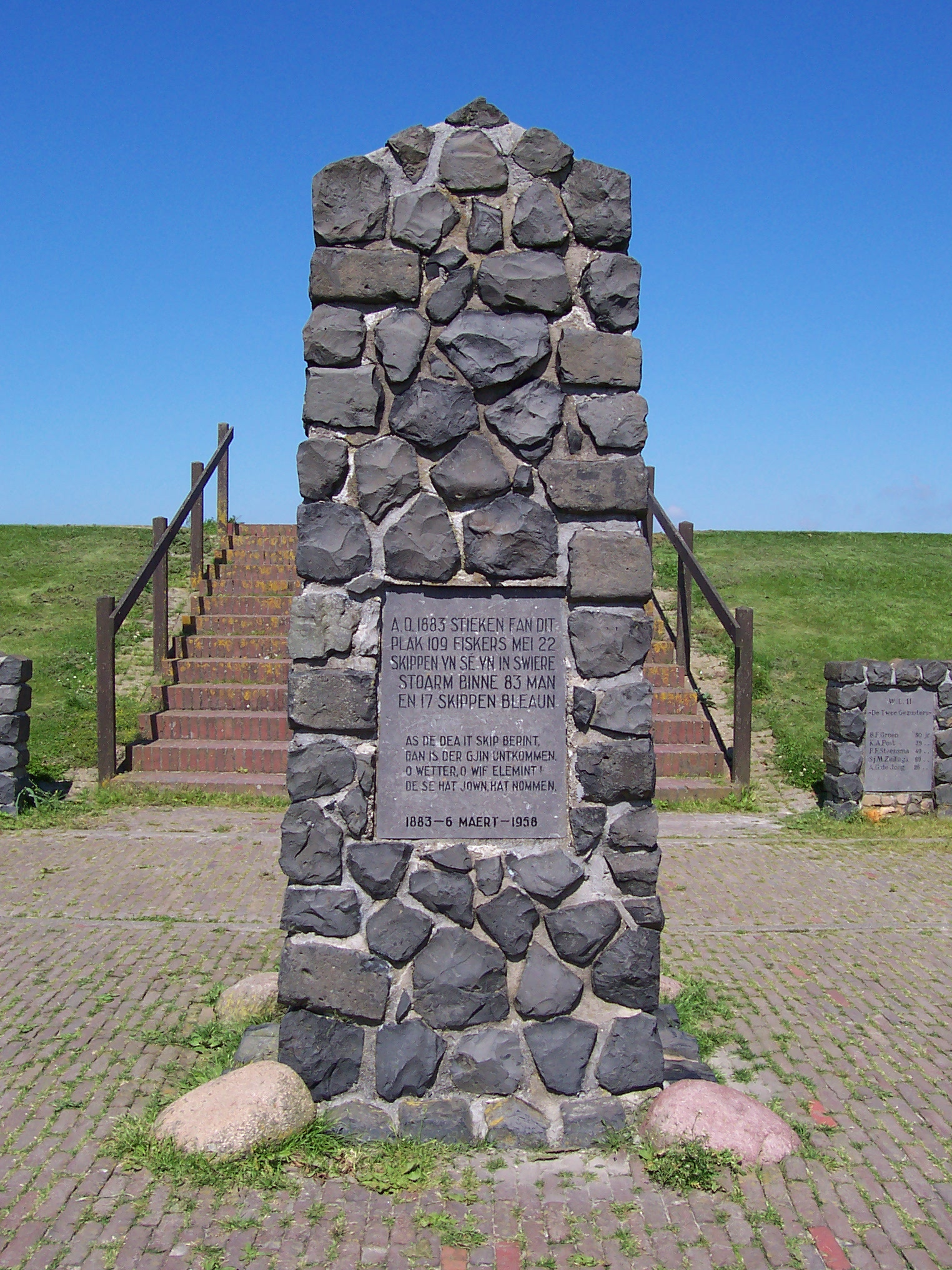
Fisher's monument

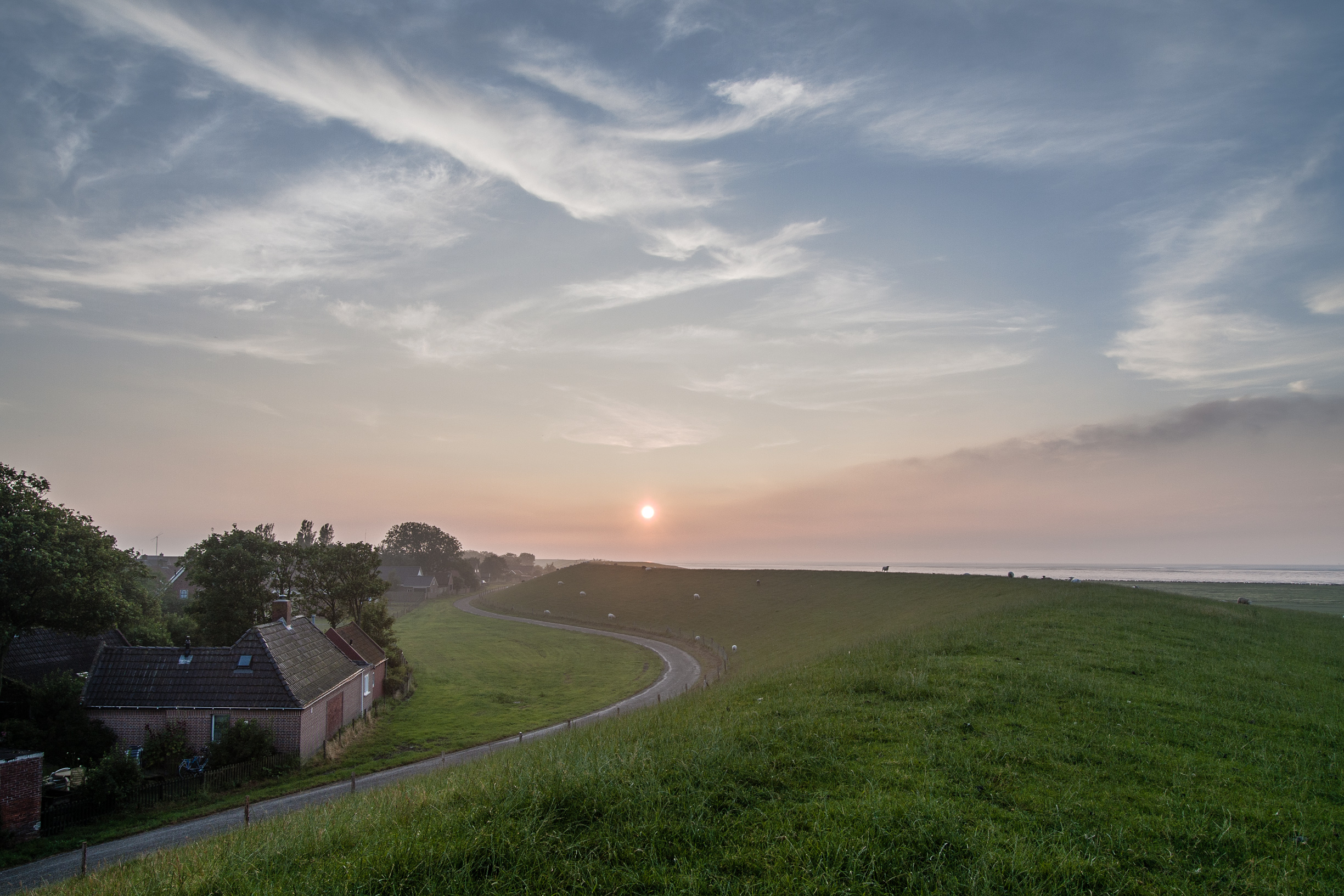
Sunset on the Wadden Sea
