= Slott =

Slott is a surname, and may refer to:

- Agnes Slott-Møller (1862–1937), Danish Symbolist painter
- Dan Slott (born 1967), American comic book writer
- Mollie Slott (1893–1967), American journalist
- Harald Slott-Møller (1864–1937), Danish painter and ceramist

== See also ==
- Slottje
- Slot (surname)
- Karl Slotta, German-American biochemist
- Ulf-Erik Slotte, Finnish diplomat
