= Slot (surname) =

Slot is a surname, and may refer to:

- Albertus Bruins Slot (1865–1930), Dutch politician
- Arne Slot (born 1978), Dutch football player and manager
- Gerrie Slot (born 1954), Dutch cyclist
- Hanke Bruins Slot (born 1977), Dutch politician
- Kees Slot (1909–1962), Dutch footballer
- Owen Slot (born 1967), British author and journalist
- Sammy Slot (born 1997), Danish footballer
- Tonny Bruins Slot (born 1947), Dutch football coach
