= Slottje =

Slottje is a surname. Notable people with the surname include:

- Helen Slottje (fl. 2009–2014), American lawyer and environmental activist
- Jeremy Slottje (fl. from 2024), American politician

== See also ==
- Slott
