= Peazens =

- Village
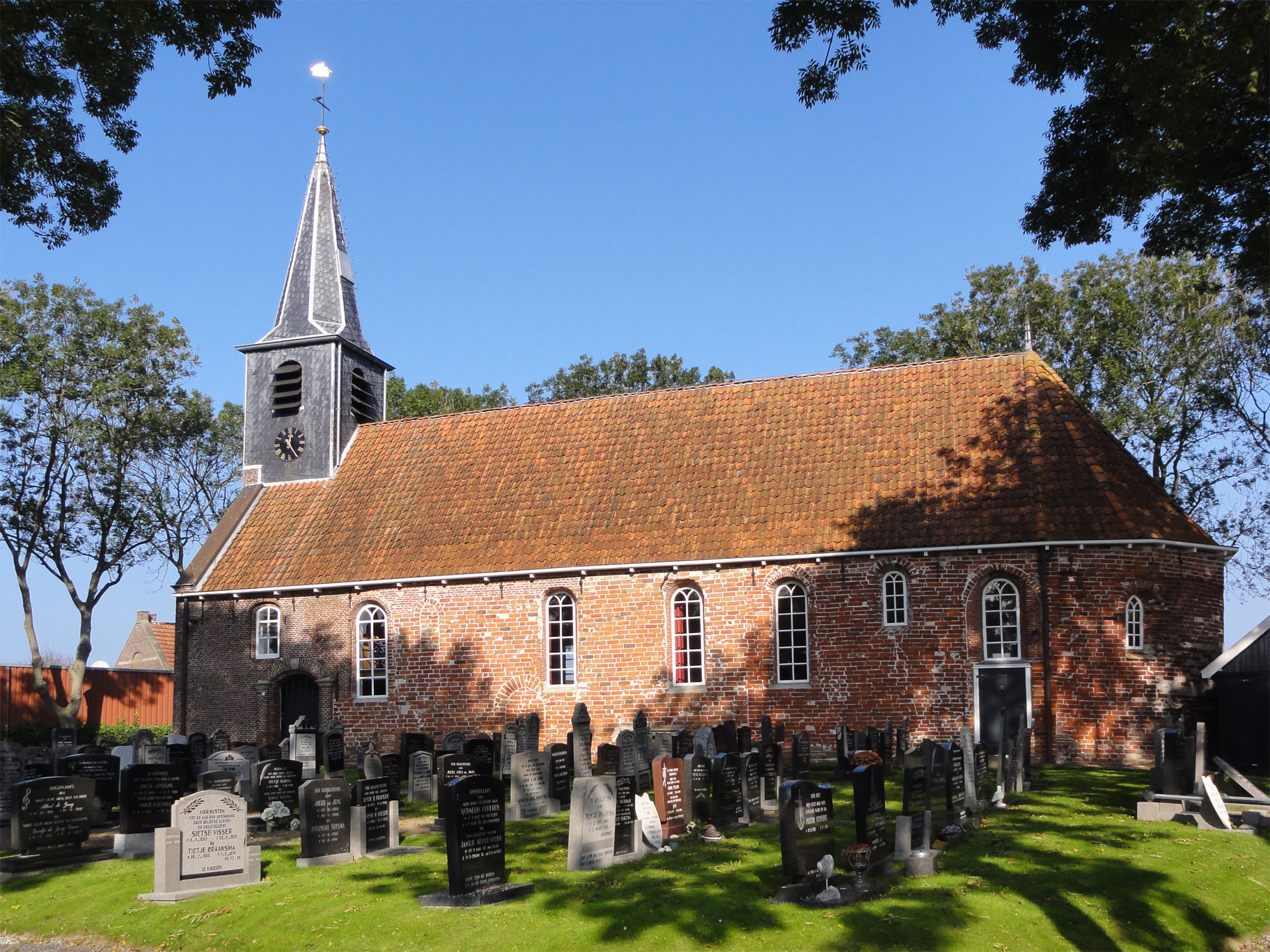
- St Anthony's church

- Flag Coat of arms

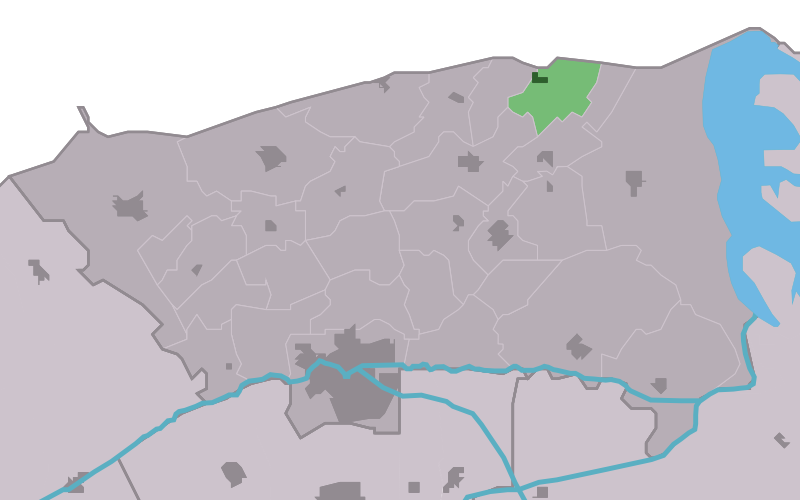
- Location in the former Dongeradeel municipality

- Location in the Netherlands Peazens (Netherlands)
- Country: Netherlands
- Province: Friesland
- Municipality: Noardeast-Fryslân

Area
  - Total: 3.63 km^{2} (1.40 sq mi)
- Elevation: 1.3 m (4.3 ft)

Population (2021)
  - Total: 230
  - Density: 63/km^{2} (160/sq mi)
- Time zone: UTC+1 (CET)
  - Summer (DST): UTC+2 (CEST)
- Postal code: 9136
- Dialing code: 0519

Peazens is a village in Noardeast-Fryslân in the province of Friesland, the Netherlands. It has a population of around 242 in January 2017. Before 2019, the village was part of the Dongeradeel municipality.

There is a restored windmill in the village, De Hond. Peazens is twinned with Moddergat, and they are often referred to as "Peazens-Moddergat".

== History ==
The village was first mentioned in 1415 as pazene wal. The etymology is unclear. The village of Peazens was founded in the 11th on the new dike along the Wadden Sea. Moddergat was founded later from Peazens, and used to consist of two hamlets: De Kamp and De Oere.

The Dutch Reformed church dates from around 1200. In 1792, the tower was demolished and the church was extended into the vacant area. Afterwards a new tower was constructed. The grist mill De Hond was built in 1861. By 1968, it had become a ruin, and was sold for ƒ1,- to De Hollandsche Molen Foundation. Between 1969 and 1971, it was restored and is occasionally in use.

In 1840, Peazens was home to 637 people. Peazens used to belong to the municipality of Oostdongeradeel and Moddergat to Westdongeradeel. In 1983, the municipalities merged.

The village's official name was changed from Paesens to Peazens in 2023.

== Gallery ==
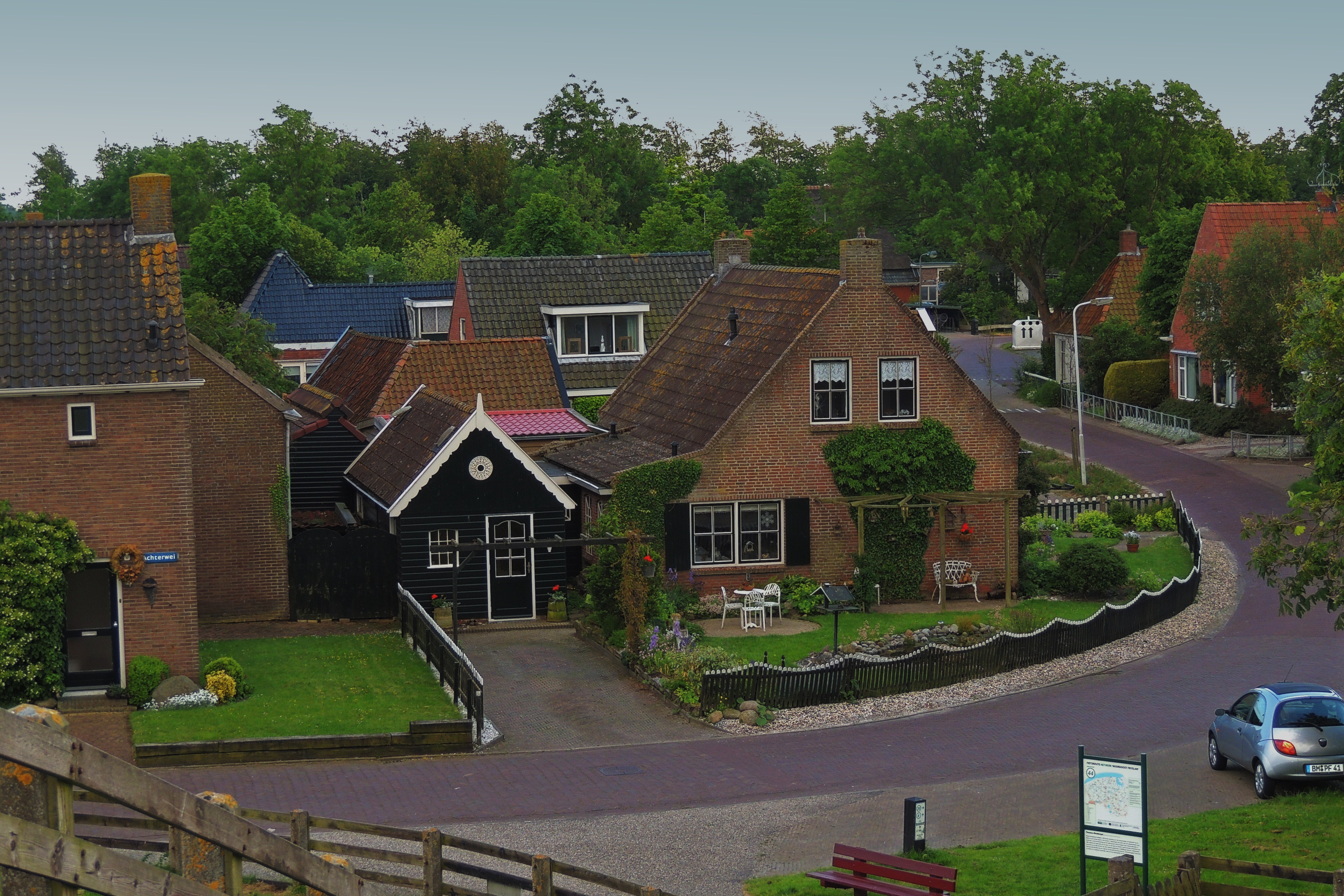
Village view

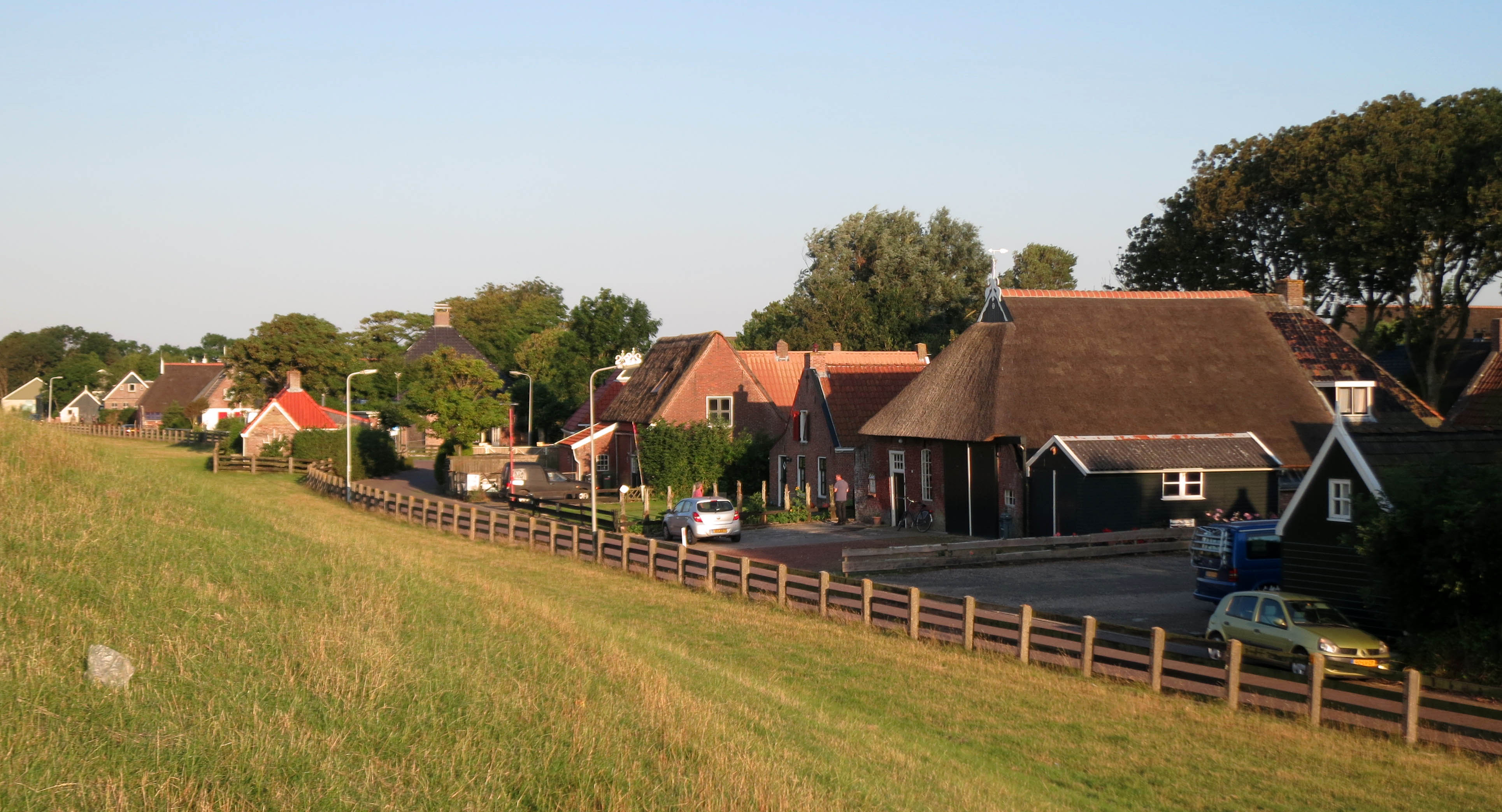
Village along the dike

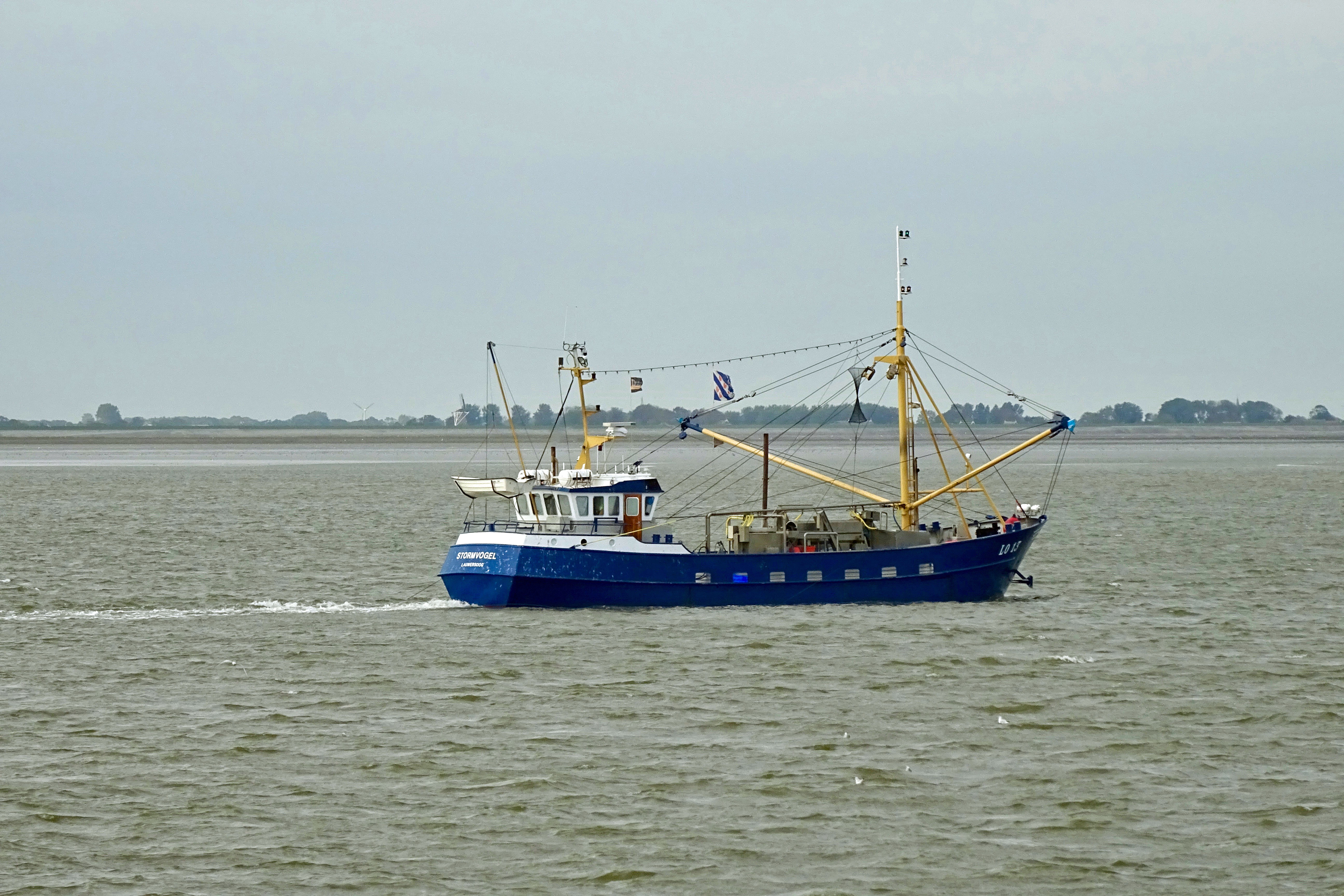
Wadden Sea with Peazens in the background

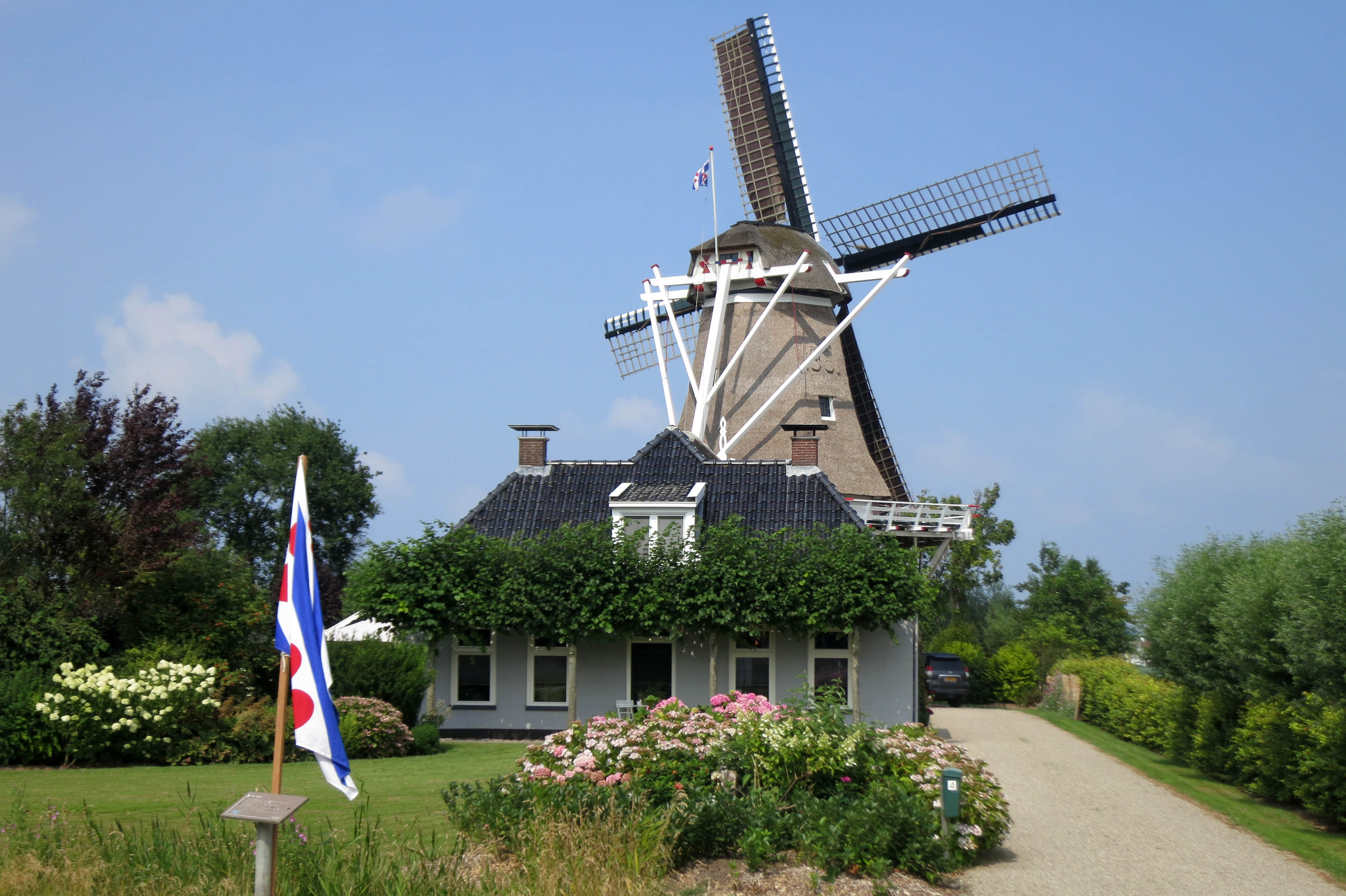
Windmill De Hond
