= De Hond, Paesens =

Smock mill in Friesland, Netherlands

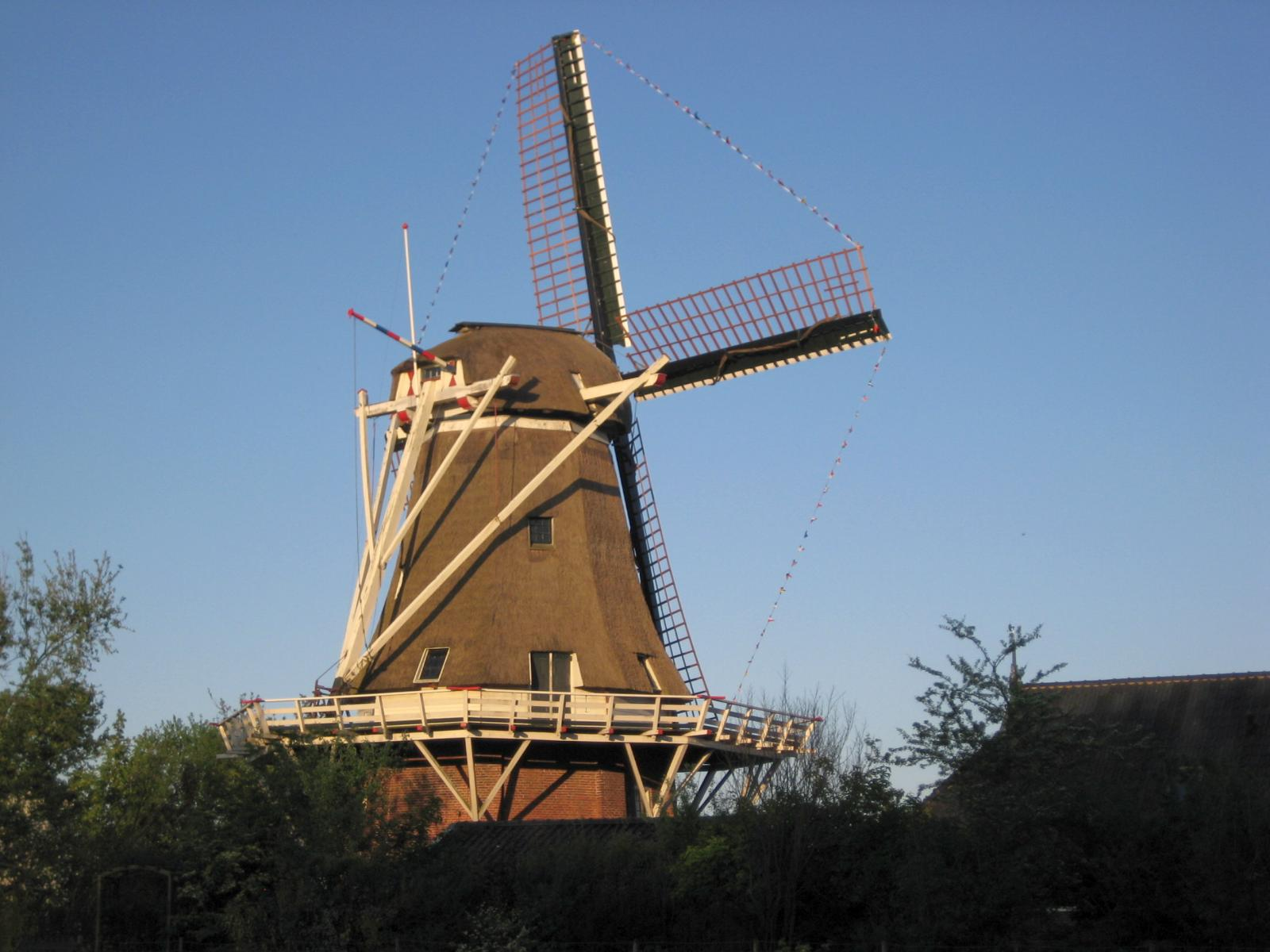
- De Hond, May 2008

Origin
- Mill name: De Hond
- Mill location: Mounewei 4, 9136 DJ Paesens
- Coordinates: 53°23′53″N 6°05′14″E
- Operator(s): Stichting De Fryske Mole
- Year built: 1861

Information
- Purpose: Corn mill and pearl barley mill
- Type: Smock mill
- Storeys: Two storey smock
- Base storeys: Two storey base
- Smock sides: Eight sides
- No. of sails: Four sails
- Type of sails: Common sails
- Windshaft: Cast iron
- Winding: Tailpole and winch
- No. of pairs of millstones: Three pairs
- Size of millstones: One pair 1.40 metres (4 ft 7 in) diameter

De Hond (English: The Dog) is a smock mill in Paesens, Friesland, Netherlands which was built in 1861 and is in working order. The mill is listed as a Rijksmonument.

== History ==
De Hond was built in 1861 for Hendrik Friedes Ritzema of Surhuisterveen and Pieter Geerts Sijtsma of Rottevalle. It was acquired in 1882 by J F Dam of Burum. In 1950, G P Dam asked for permission to demolish the mill. This was granted in 1953. The mill was not demolished. It was sold in 1968 to Vereniging De Hollandsche Molen for a symbolic ƒ1. The mill was restored in 1969-71 by millwright A Roemeling of Scheemda, Groningen. On 28 December 1977, De Hond was sold to Stichting De Fryske Mole, becoming that organisation's 18th mill. A further restoration took place in 1995. New sails were fitted in 2008. The mill is listed as a Rijksmonument, No. 31591.

== Description ==
De Hond is what the Dutch describe as a "Stellingmolen". It is a smock mill on a brick base. The stage is 5.90 metres (19 ft 4 in) above ground level. The smock and cap are thatched. The mill is winded by tailpole and winch. The sails are Common sails. They have a span of 19.00 metres (62 ft 4 in). The sails are carried on a cast-iron windshaft which was made by Gietijzerij H. J. Koning of Foxham, Groningen in 1904. The windshaft also carries the brake wheel, which has 61 cogs. This drives the wallower (32 cogs) at the top of the upright shaft. At the bottom of the upright shaft is the great spur wheel, which has 85 cogs. The great spur wheel drives one pair of millstones via a lantern pinion stone nut which has 23 staves. The millstones are 1.40 metres (4 ft 7 in) diameter. The two pairs of pearl barley stones are each driven by a lantern pinion stone nut which has 20 staves.

== Millers ==
- Hendrik Friedes Ritzema (1861–1882)
- Pieter Geerts Sijtsma (1861–1882)
- J F Dam (1882- )
- G P Dam ( -1950)

References for above:-

== Public access ==
De Hond is open to the public on Saturdays between 13:00 and 16:00.
