= Berthold von Bernstorff =

German politician, forester and landowner (1842–1917)

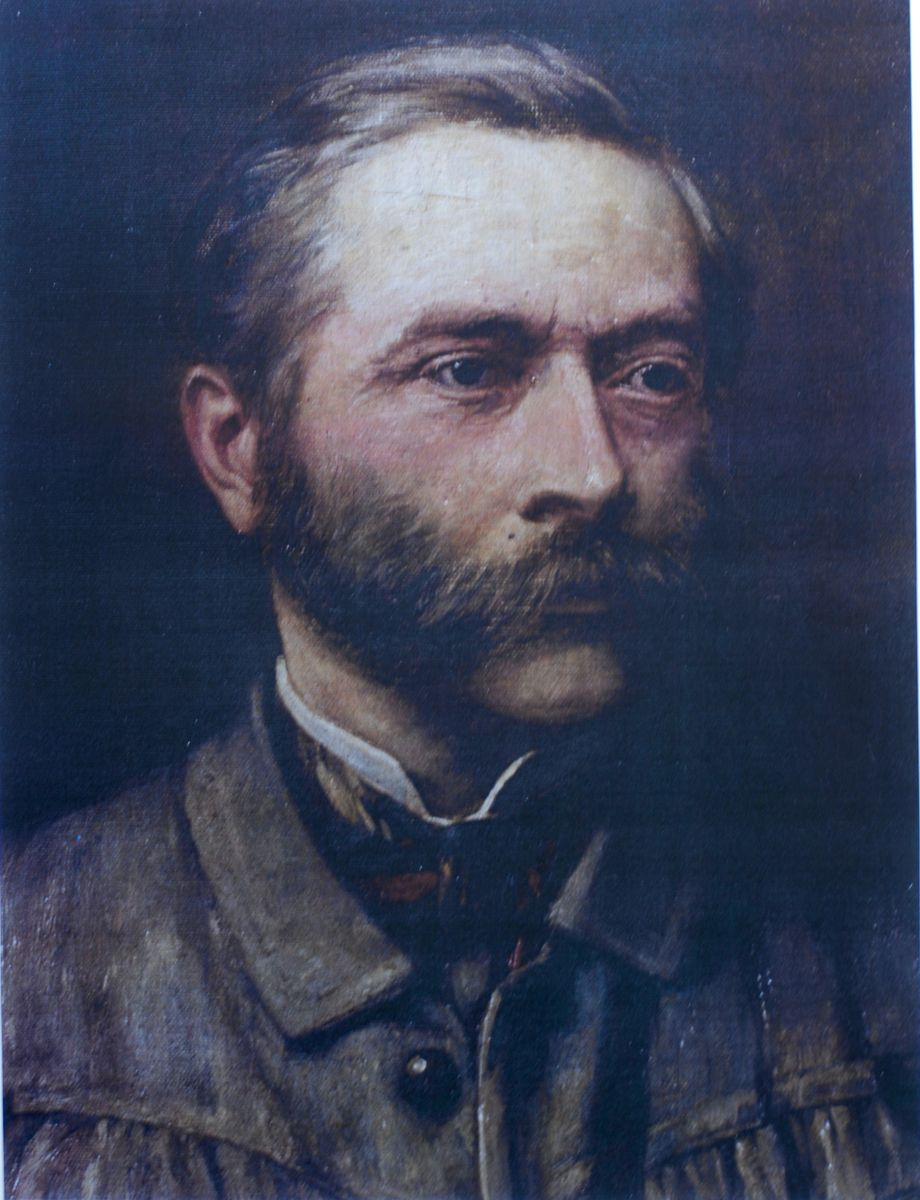
- Von Bernstorff (c. 1882)

Member of the Reichstag
- In office 1893–1907

Personal details
- Born: Berthold Hartwig Arthur von Bernstorff; 21 January 1842 Berlin, Kingdom of Prussia
- Died: 12 February 1917 (aged 75) Höllwangen, Baden, German Empire
- Party: German-Hanoverian Party
- Occupation: politician, forester, landowner

Berthold Hartwig Arthur, Graf von Bernstorff (21 January 1842 – 12 February 1917) was a German politician, forester and landowner. He served in the Reichstag from 1893 until 1907. In 1893, he bought the Dutch island of Schiermonnikoog.

== Biography ==
Von Bernstorff was born on 21 January 1842 in Berlin, Kingdom of Prussia. He studied at the Forest Academy in Eisenach and graduated in forestry from the University of Göttingen. He worked at the forestry department of Hannover until 1866. Between 1869 and 1883, he worked in the forest administration of Gartow.

From 1883 until 1891, von Bernstorff was a member of the District Council of Dannenberg and Bleckede. He served in the Reichstag from 1893 until 1907 for the German-Hanoverian Party.

The island of Schiermonnikoog in Friesland, Netherlands was private property. In August 1893, John Eric Banck sold the island to von Bernstorff. Even though it was under German ownership, the island remained part of Friesland, and the citizens remained Dutch. Von Bernstorff had planned to turn the island into a luxury holiday resort similar to Sylt, however the investments remained limited to a jetty and a little forest.

Von Bernstroff died on 12 February 1917 in Höllwangen (nowadays part of Überlingen), Baden, at the age of 75.

== Aftermath ==
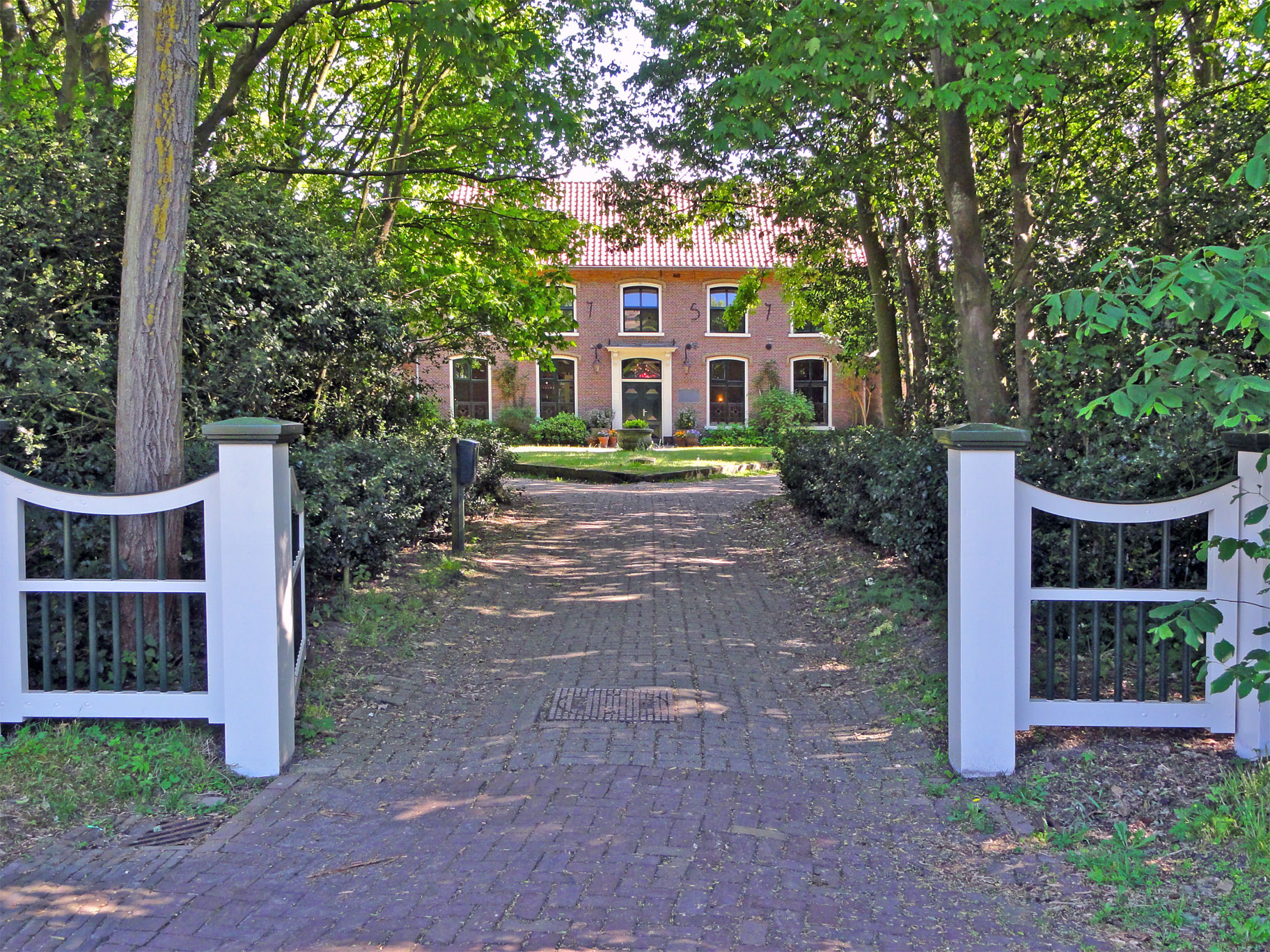
Rijsbergen estate

Schiermonnikoog would remain in the family. The Netherlands made several attempts to buy the island, however the family refused to sell. During World War II, it was owned by Bechtold Eugen von Bernstorff, his grandson. In July 1945, after the liberation of the Netherlands, the island was seized by the Netherlands as enemy property.

The von Bernstorff family would spend years in litigation to reclaim their island, but to no avail. In 1983, Germany awarded von Bernstorff DM80,000 as compensation for their losses. In 1998, Hotel Graaf Bernstorff opened on the island. The Rijsbergen estate, the residence of the owner of Schiermonnikoog from 1757 until 1945, became a Cistercian monastery in 2021.
