= Albertus Bruins Slot =

Dutch politician (1865–1930)

Mayor of Schiermonnikoog
- In office 1896–1901

Mayor of Smallingerland
- In office 1901–1930

Member of the States of Friesland
- In office 1910–1930

Personal details
- Born: 4 August 1865 Hoogeveen, Netherlands
- Died: 27 August 1930 (aged 65) Rotterdam, Netherlands
- Party: Anti-Revolutionary Party

Albertus Bruins Slot (4 August 1865 – 27 August 1930) was a Dutch politician.

== Career ==
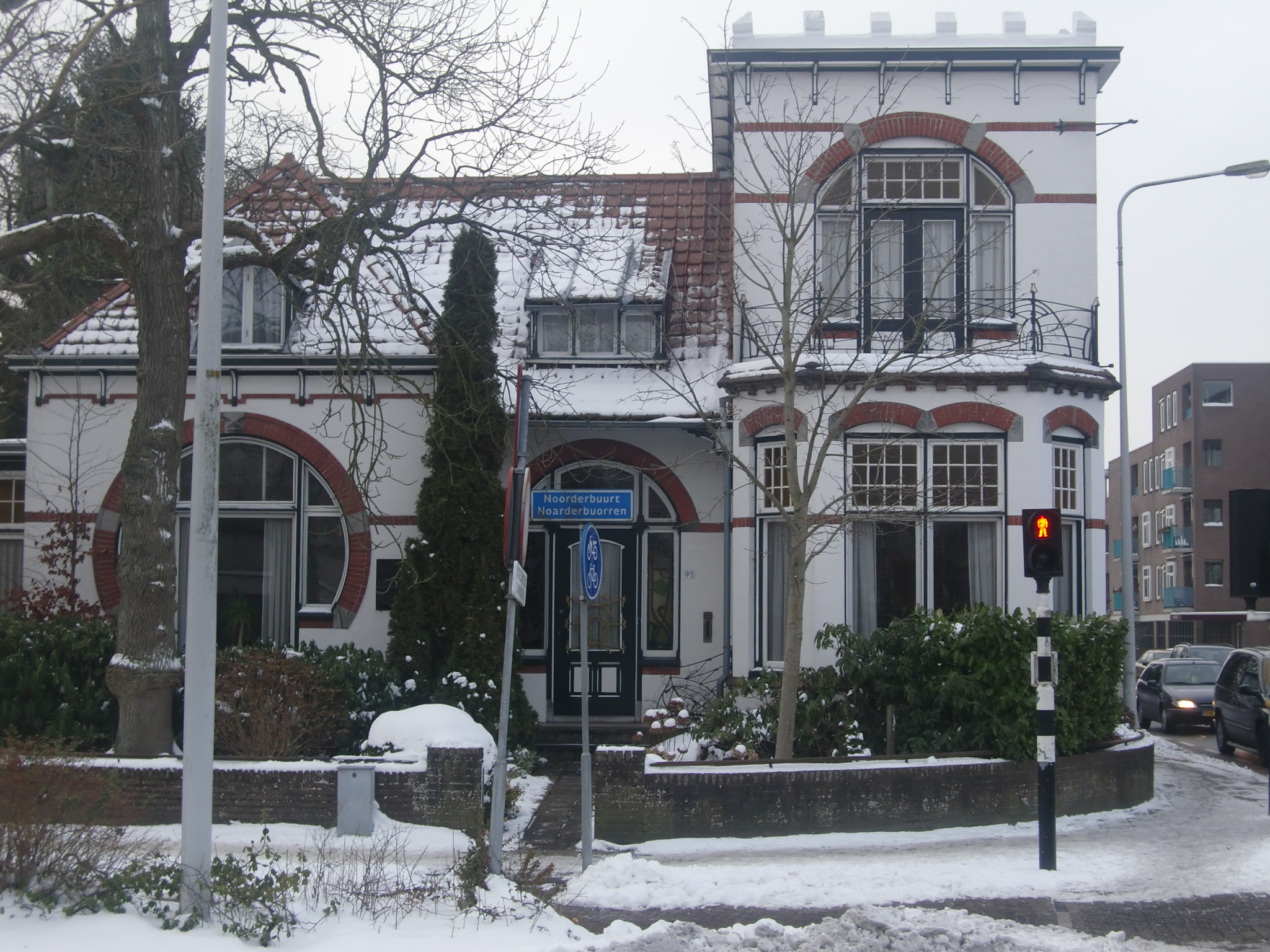
Mayor’s residence at Noorderbuurt 95 in Drachten

Bruins Slot began his civil service career at the municipal secretariat of Kollum, working under his father-in-law H.J. Hoogeboom. After several years, he became mayor of Schiermonnikoog (1896–1901). On 24 December 1901, he was installed as mayor of Smallingerland (1901–1930). From 1910 onwards, he served as a member of the States of Friesland representing the Anti-Revolutionary Party. In 1926 his 25th anniversary as mayor of Smallingerland was celebrated.

In 1906, he commissioned architect Johannes Petrus Hazeu to design a Jugendstil-style residence on the Noorder Straatweg (now Noorderbuurt 95) in Drachten.

== Personal life ==
Bruins Slot was born in Hoogeveen, Drenthe as the son of Jan Warners Bruins Slot, a peat excavator and alderman, and Alberdina ten Cate. He married Antje Hoogeboom in 1896. They had three children, including politician Sieuwert Bruins Slot.

Bruins Slot lived in Drachten. Due to a long illness, he was admitted to the Eudokia Hospital in Rotterdam, where he died at the age of 65. He was buried on 30 August at the general cemetery in Hoogeveen.

== Awards ==
He was appointed a Knight of the Order of Orange-Nassau on 30 August 1921.
