= Klozum =

Traditional feast in dutch island

Klozum (or Klozem) is a holiday feast celebrated every 5 December on the Dutch island of Schiermonnikoog. The name literally means "Uncle Claus" (as in Saint Nicholas). Despite the name and date, the tradition is not directly related to Sinterklaas, which is also celebrated on 5 December in the Netherlands. Rather, it is related to similar traditions on other Frisian Islands, such as Klaasohm on Borkum, Ouwe Sunderklaas on Texel, Opkleden on Vlieland, and Sunderklazen on Ameland.

During the feast, the islanders disguise themselves as "klozums" and visit homes on the island. The disguises are often as prominent locals, national and international celebrities, and fantasy and fairy-tale characters such as Arabs or cowboys. Both men and women disguise themselves. The klozums also distort their voice in order to further disguise their identity.

The klozums begin visiting homes on the island around 8:30 p.m., alone or in groups. In order to welcome the klozums, the homes' front doors are left ajar and a lantern is lit or a curtain is left open. Once inside, the klozums put on a performance, acting out various characters or situations, often satirizing important events or decisions that have taken place on the island in the past year. After the klozums have departed, the inhabitants must guess who had been hiding behind the disguises.

Klozum culminates in a demasking at midnight, when all the klozums drop their masks and disguises to reveal who they really are. The demasking is followed by celebrations lasting into the night.

Although normally celebrated on 5 December, the feast is moved to the following Monday if the 5th falls on a Saturday or Sunday.

The children on the island have their own Klozum feast on 3 and 4 December. The lytje klozums ("little klozums") visit homes during the afternoon, shouting "Klozum, Klozum", and put on an act or sing a song, earning them a reward of candy or cookies.

Little is known of the history of the Klozum tradition. It dates back at least to the 19th Century, when there were several mentions of Klozum.
