= Schiermonnikoog =

Schiermonnikoog Skiermûntseach
- Municipality
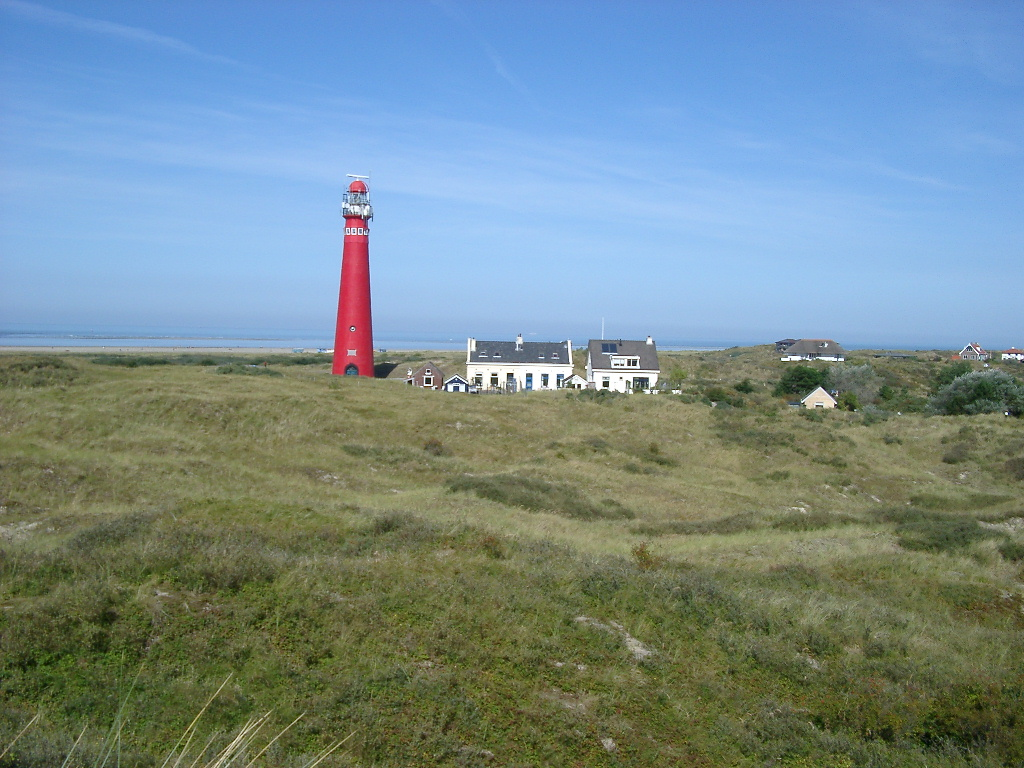
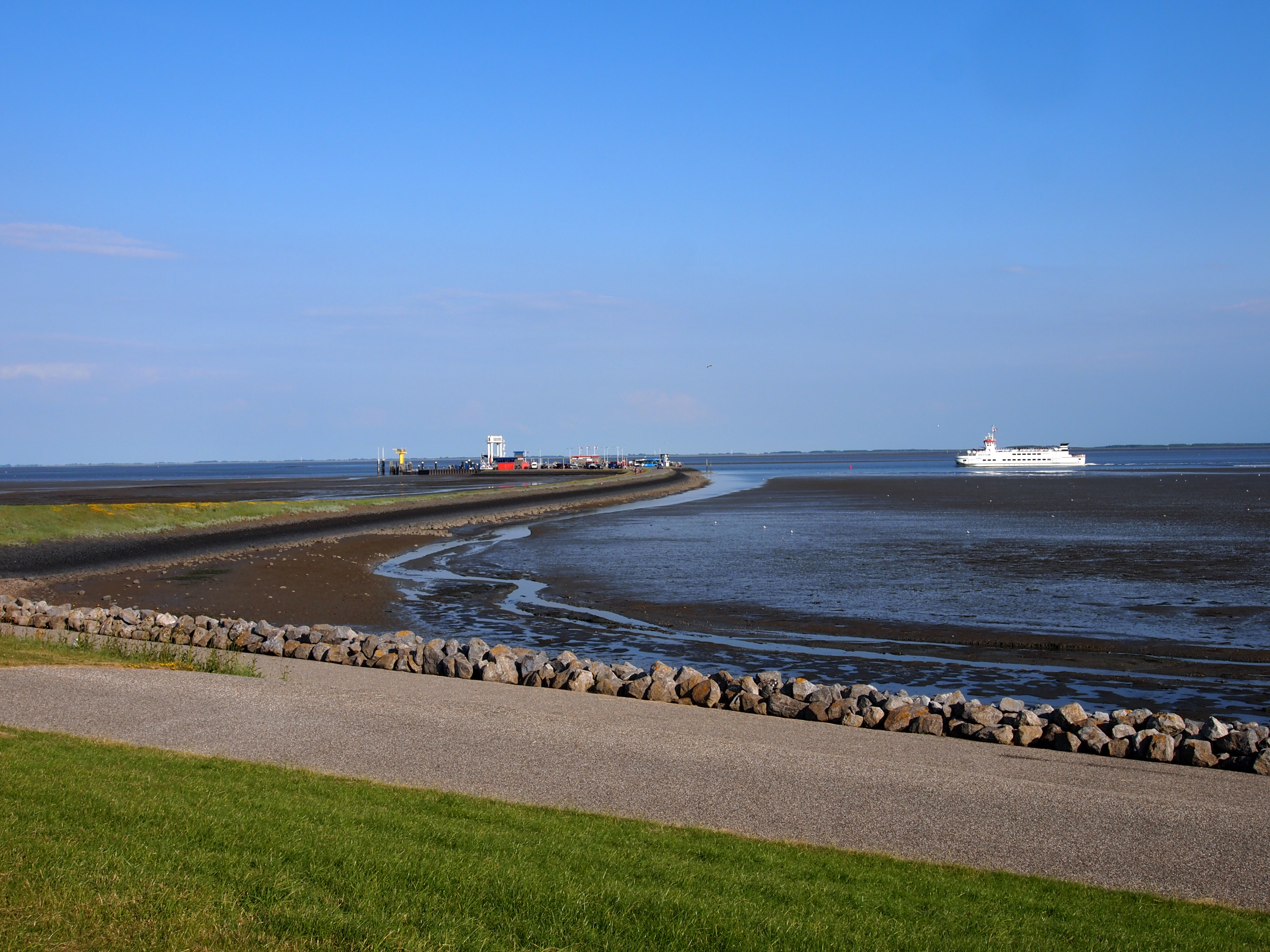
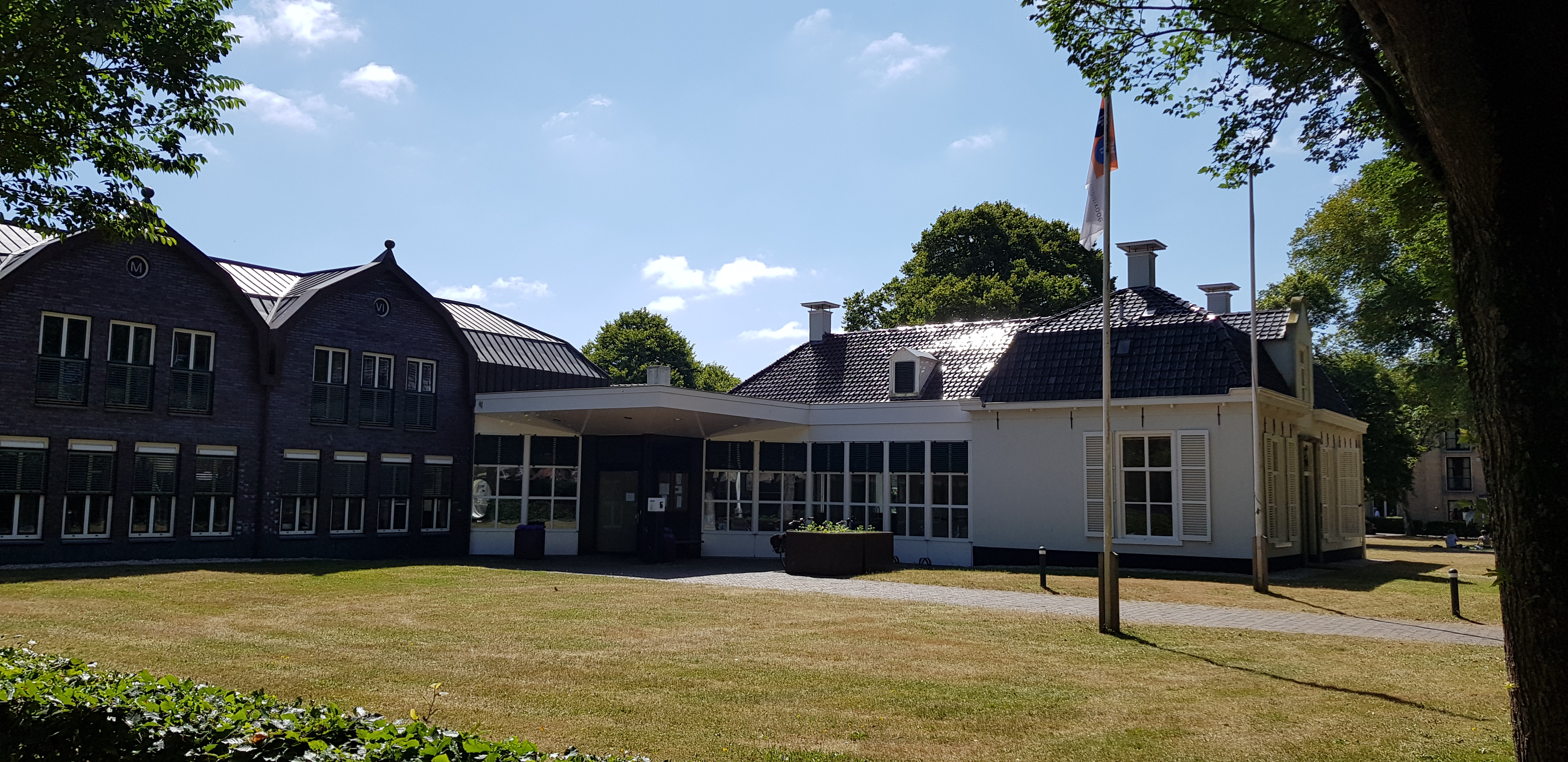
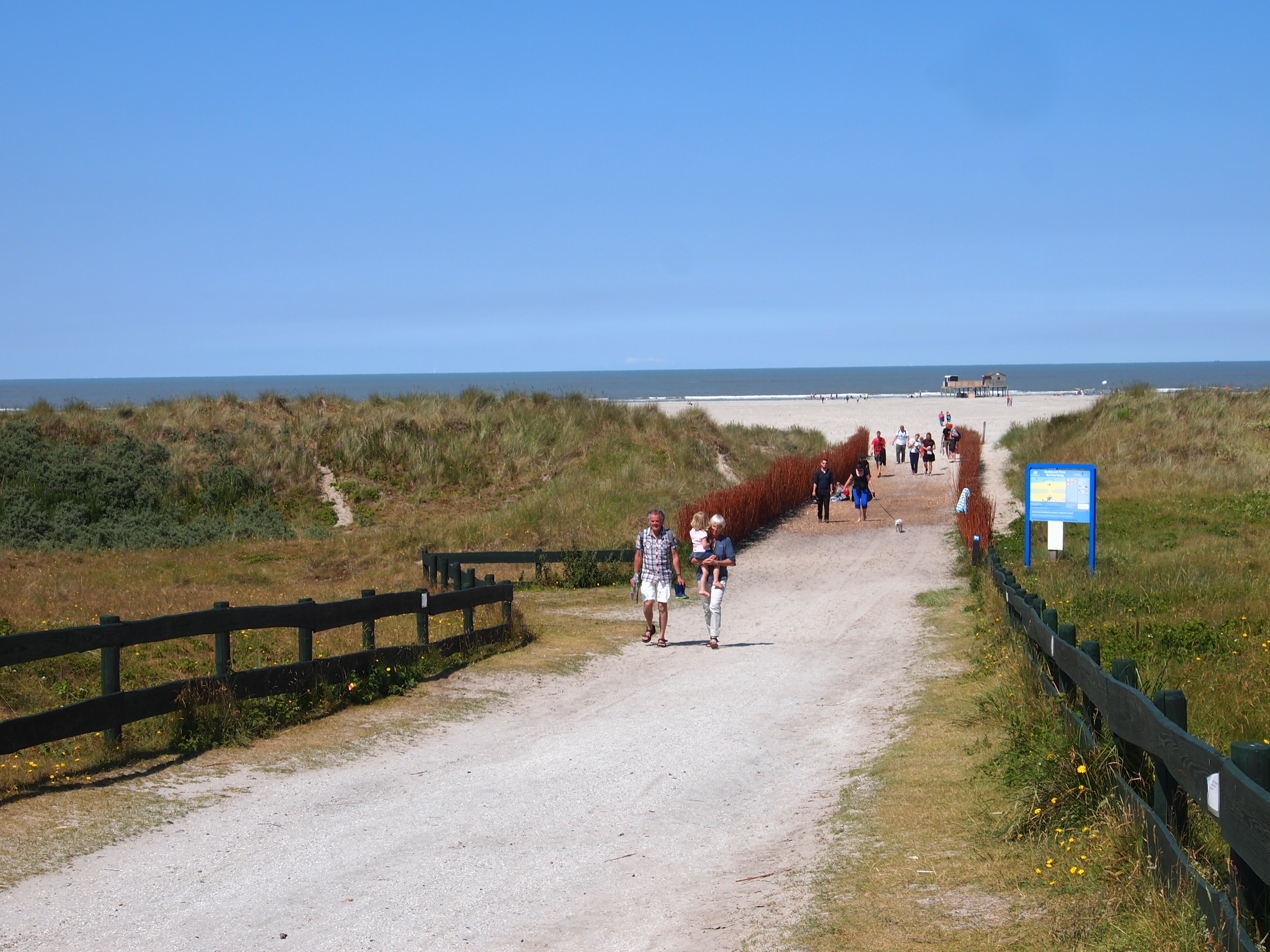
- North Tower Ferry Schiermonnikoog City Hall Beach

- Flag Coat of arms

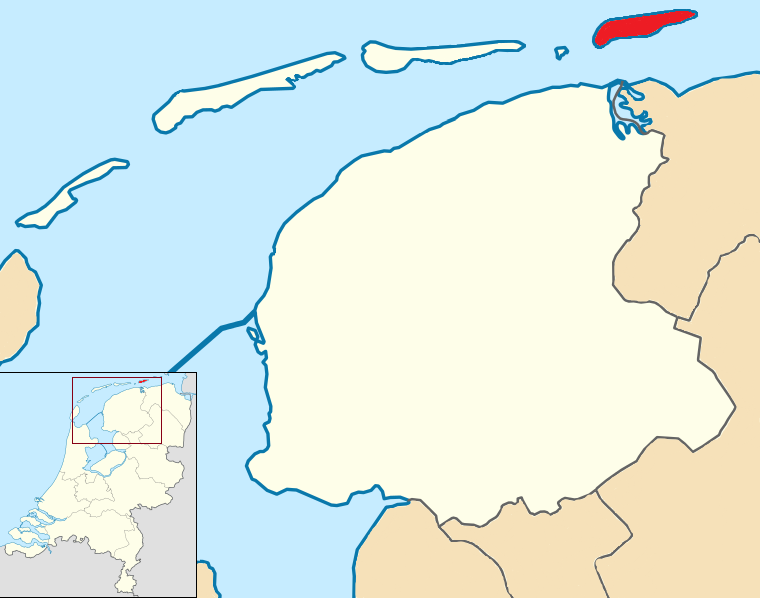
- Location in Friesland
- Coordinates: 53°29′24″N 06°13′30″E
- Country: Netherlands
- Province: Friesland

Government
  - Body: Municipal council
  - Mayor: Hendri Meendering (GL)

Area
  - Total: 199.07 km^{2} (76.86 sq mi)
  - Land: 40.50 km^{2} (15.64 sq mi)
  - Water: 158.57 km^{2} (61.22 sq mi)
- Elevation: 4 m (13 ft)

Population (January 2021)
  - Total: 931
  - Density: 23/km^{2} (60/sq mi)
- Demonym: Schiermonnikoger
- Time zone: UTC+1 (CET)
  - Summer (DST): UTC+2 (CEST)
- Postcode: 9166
- Area code: 0519
- Website: www.schiermonnikoog.nl

Schiermonnikoog (Dutch: [ˌsxiːrmɔnəkˈoːx]; West Frisian: Skiermûntseach [ˌskiəmuːnˈtsɪəχ]; Schiermonnikoog Frisian: Schiermonnikeig) is an island, a municipality and national park in the Northern Netherlands. Schiermonnikoog is one of the West Frisian Islands, and is part of the province of Friesland. It is situated between the islands of Ameland and Rottumerplaat.

The island is 16 km (9.9 mi) long and 4 km (2.5 mi) wide and is the site of the Netherlands' first national park. The only village on the island is also called Schiermonnikoog. Around 943 people permanently reside on the island, making the municipality both the least populated and the least densely populated in the Netherlands. Because the island is small and flat, only 200 islanders have taken out the special licence allowing them to keep their own car, with the result that the few streets are virtually car-free.

Roughly 300,000 people visit the island every year, with some staying in the 5,500 beds available in holiday homes, apartments and hotels. Most visitors, however, are day trippers (about 4,000 a day in July and August alone), with the result that after the last ferry leaves at 7.30pm, calm returns to Langestreek, the village high street.

== History ==
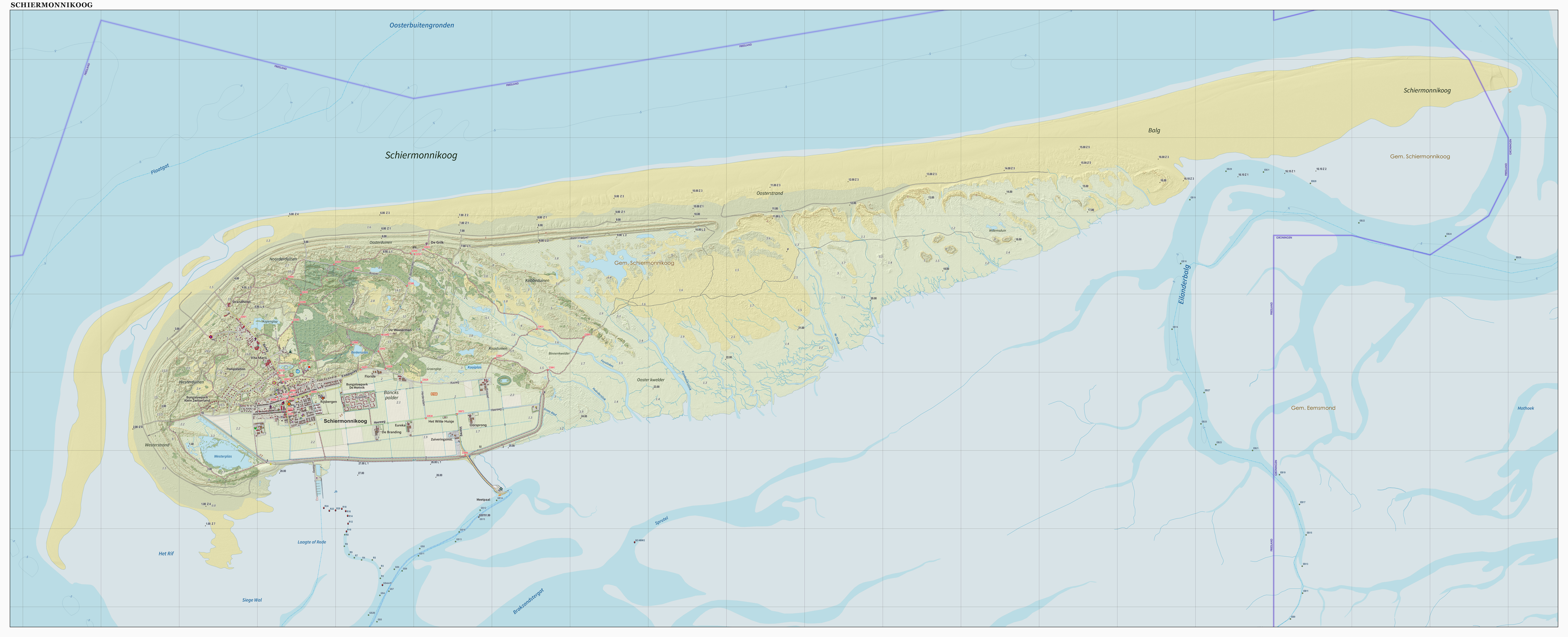
Dutch topographic map of Schiermonnikoog, December 2015

Aerial view from the southwest

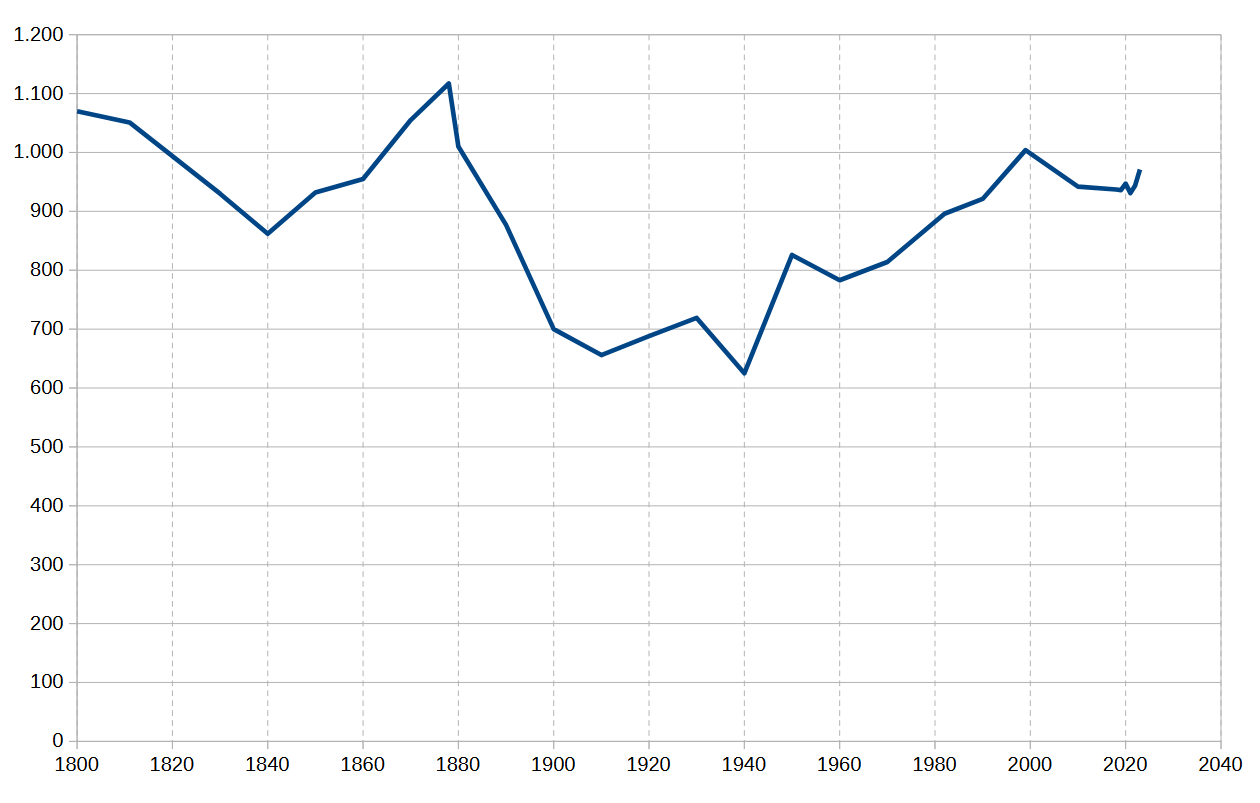
Historical population, 1800–2023

As a result of the tidal current, the prevailing winds, and North Sea storms, the island is slowly moving to the south and the east. In the year 1250, it lay roughly 2 km to the north of its present position, and it then had a significantly different shape.

The earliest mention of Schiermonnikoog in writing dates from October 1440, in a document written for Philip the Good. The island's first known owners were the monks of Klaarkamp Abbey, a Cistercian monastery near Rinsumageest, on the mainland. "Monnik" means "monk", "schier" is an archaic word meaning "grey", referring to the colour of the monks' habits, and "oog" translates as "island". The name Schiermonnikoog can therefore be translated as Grey Monk Island.

During the Reformation, the monasteries in the northern Netherlands were dissolved. In 1580, Schiermonnikoog became the property of the States of Friesland. Around 1640, the States sold the island to the wealthy Stachouwer family, and for the next three centuries, Schiermonnikoog remained private property.

Around 1700, the population of Schiermonnikoog was divided among four villages or settlements. The largest of these was Westerburen, which had developed around the medieval buildings of the grey monks. In 1717 and 1720, storms flooded Westerburen, which had to be abandoned around 1725, because of drifting sand and the advancing sea. In 1756 a new town, named Oosterburen, was built to the east. Nowadays this second village is named Schiermonnikoog, after the island. Also in the 18th century the people of the island rebelled against Lady Catharina Maria Stachouwer, and the States of Friesland sent troops to protect her and to restore law and order.

In August 1799, during the Napoleonic Wars, a small squadron of Britain's Royal Navy under the command of Captain Adam Mackenzie of HMS Pylades attacked and captured the former Royal Navy gun-brig Crash, moored between Schiermonnikoog and Groningen. The boats of Mackenzie's squadron then attacked the six-gun Dutch schooner Vengeance and a battery on Schiermonnikoog. The British were able to burn the schooner and spike the guns of the battery. (Note: This exploit would earn those Royal Navy seamen who survived until 1847 the Naval General Service Medal with clasp "SCHIERMONNIKOOG 12 AUGT. 1799".)

In 1859, the Stachouwer family sold the island to John Eric Banck from The Hague. Among other works Banck started planting the sand dunes with marram grass to stabilize them. There is now a monument to him on the top of the dike that he built.

In 1892, Banck sold the island to a German count, Berthold von Bernstorff. In 1940, Bechtold Eugen von Bernstorff, his grandson, inherited Schiermonnikoog That same year, during the Second World War, KLM briefly provided passenger and postal services to Schiermonnikoog and nearby Ameland, landing its Douglas DC-3s on the beach. In May the Germans invaded the Netherlands, and the Wehrmacht occupied the island, but Bernstorff ensured that the islanders were largely left in peace.

During the War, the German Army heavily fortified the island as part of the Atlantic Wall defence line, and the number of German troops came to equal the island's native population of 600. Towards the end of the war, hundreds of SS troops, along with members of the SD, fled to the island, reinforcing the German contingent already there.

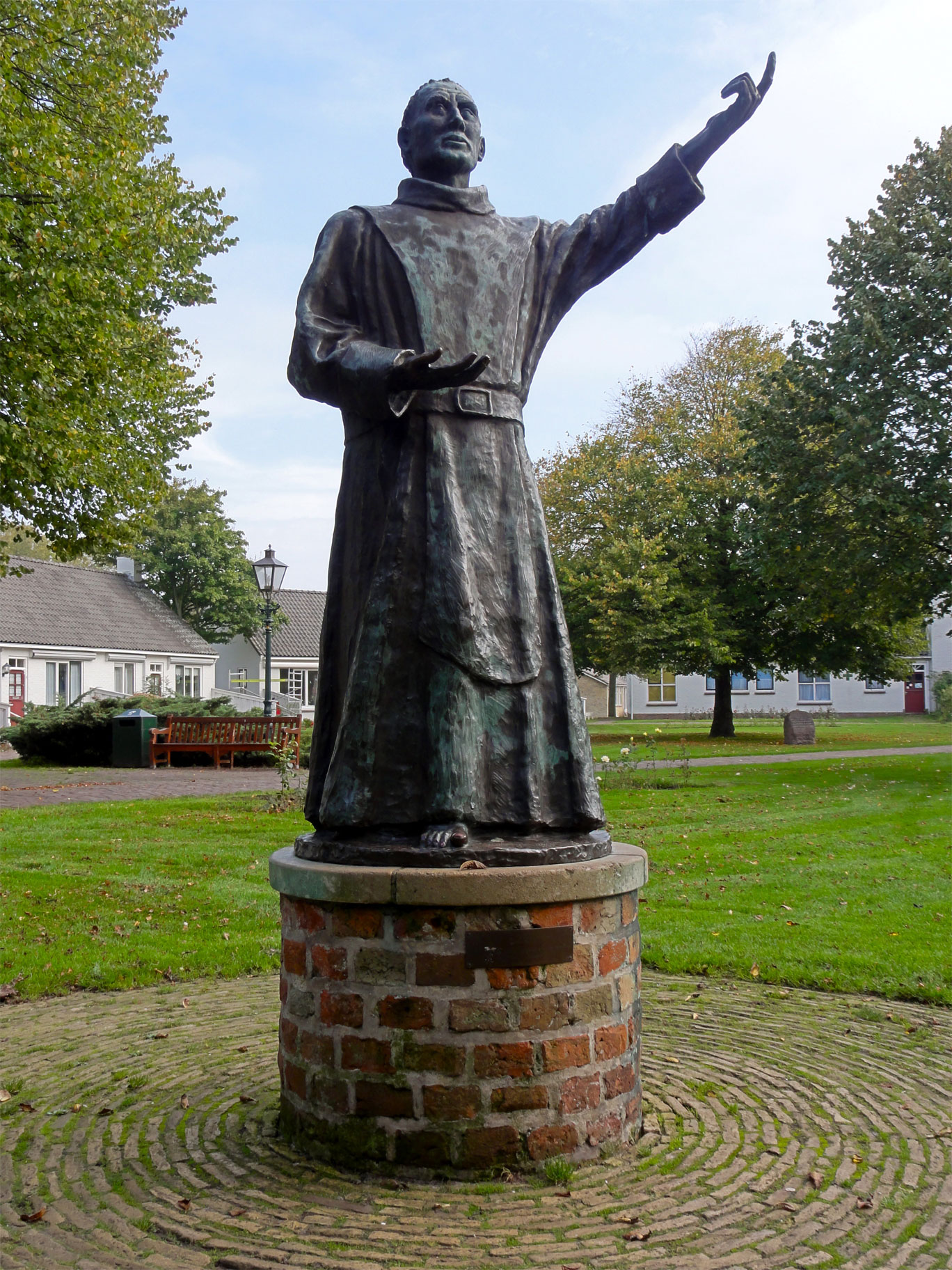
De Schiere Monnik by Martin van Waning

After the German surrender, the Germans on the island failed to accept the surrender, but the Canadian forces responsible for the sector that included the island did not attack them to force their surrender. After several weeks of negotiations the German commander did agree to respect the surrender and the German soldiers were evacuated to Wilhelmshaven in Germany. On 11 June 1945 the island became the last part of the Netherlands to be liberated from Axis occupation by the Allies.

After the War, the Dutch government confiscated Schiermonnikoog from Bernstorff on the grounds that he was German and owned the island during the war, making it 'enemy property'. In 1949 the island became an independent municipality and part of the Province of Friesland. Bernstorff died in 1987 and is buried on Schiermonnikoog in the graveyard of its Reformed Church.

In 2006, the eastern border of the island was moved eastward, into the former territory of the municipality of Eemsmond in the province of Groningen, so that the municipal government of Schiermonnikoog would have the ability to respond from its own territory in the event of a calamity or disaster.

== Demographics ==
As demonstrated in the table below, the greatest age group of Schiermonnikoog are seniors (aged 65+).

Age distribution in Schiermonnikoog
Age group	Population	Percentage
0-15	86	8.9%
15-25	83	8.6%
25-45	218	22.5%
45-65	279	28.8%
65+	305	31.4%

82% of residents are Dutch. 11,6% of residents are from outside of Europe, 6,4% of from inside of Europe.

== Tourism ==
The main source of income on Schiermonnikoog is tourism. The island houses a campground, a ferry pier, a tidal harbour for small vessels and approximately 15 hotels and hundreds of vacation houses and apartments. The eastern part of the island forms an important nature reserve, with access very restricted during the breeding season of the many birds that nest there. The island as a whole is Schiermonnikoog National Park, one of the Dutch national parks.

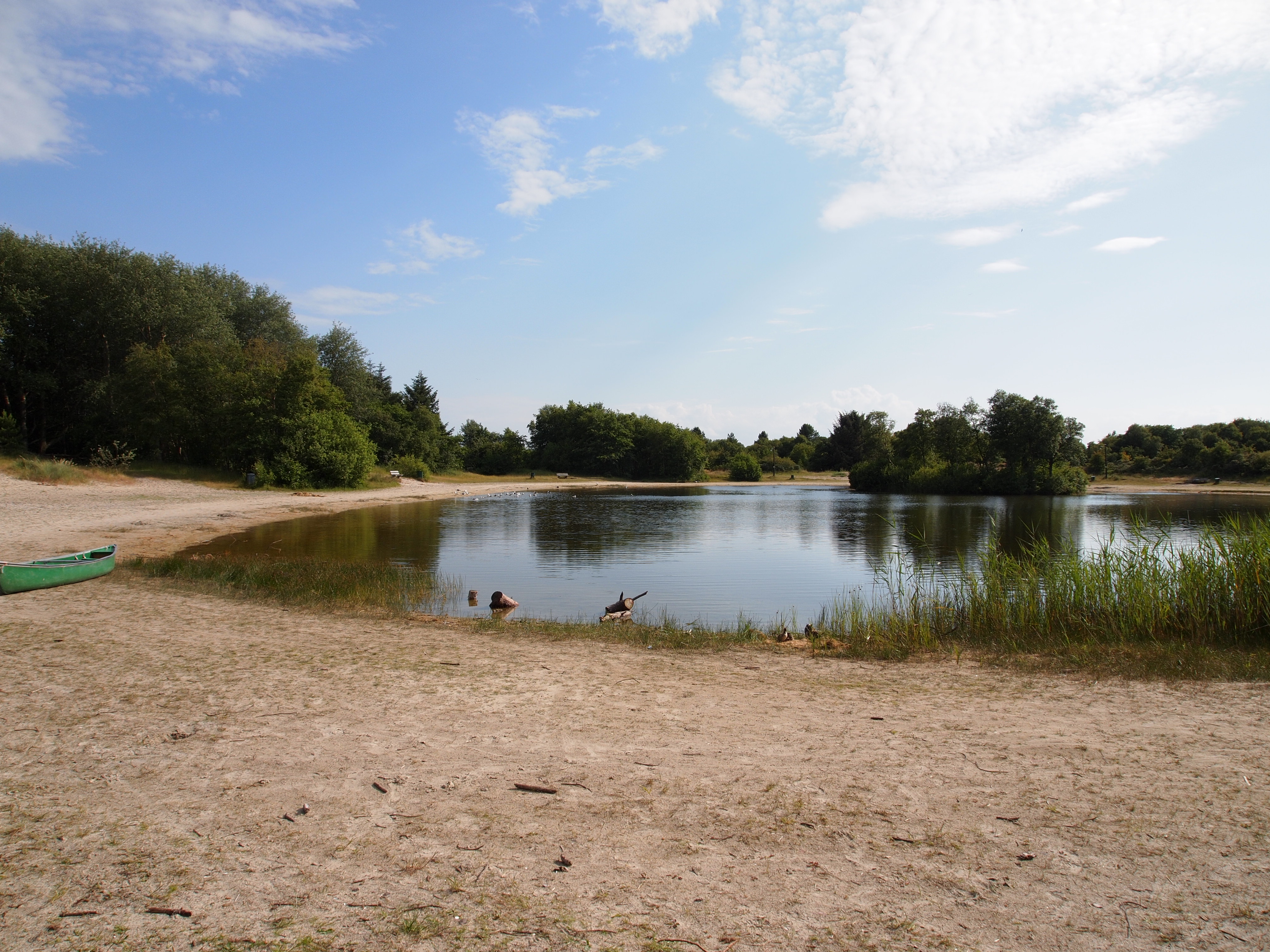
The Berkenplas

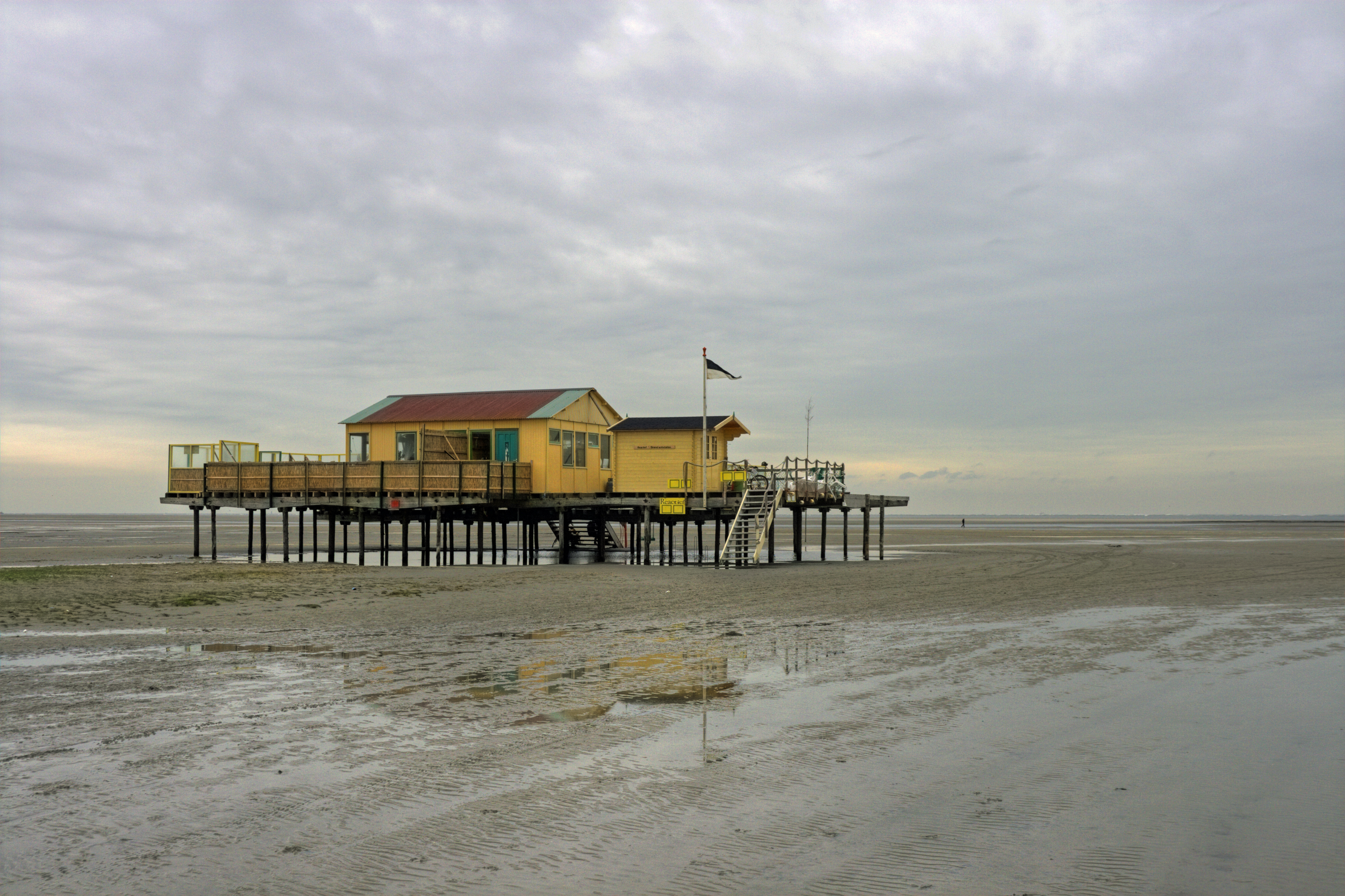
Beach pavilion

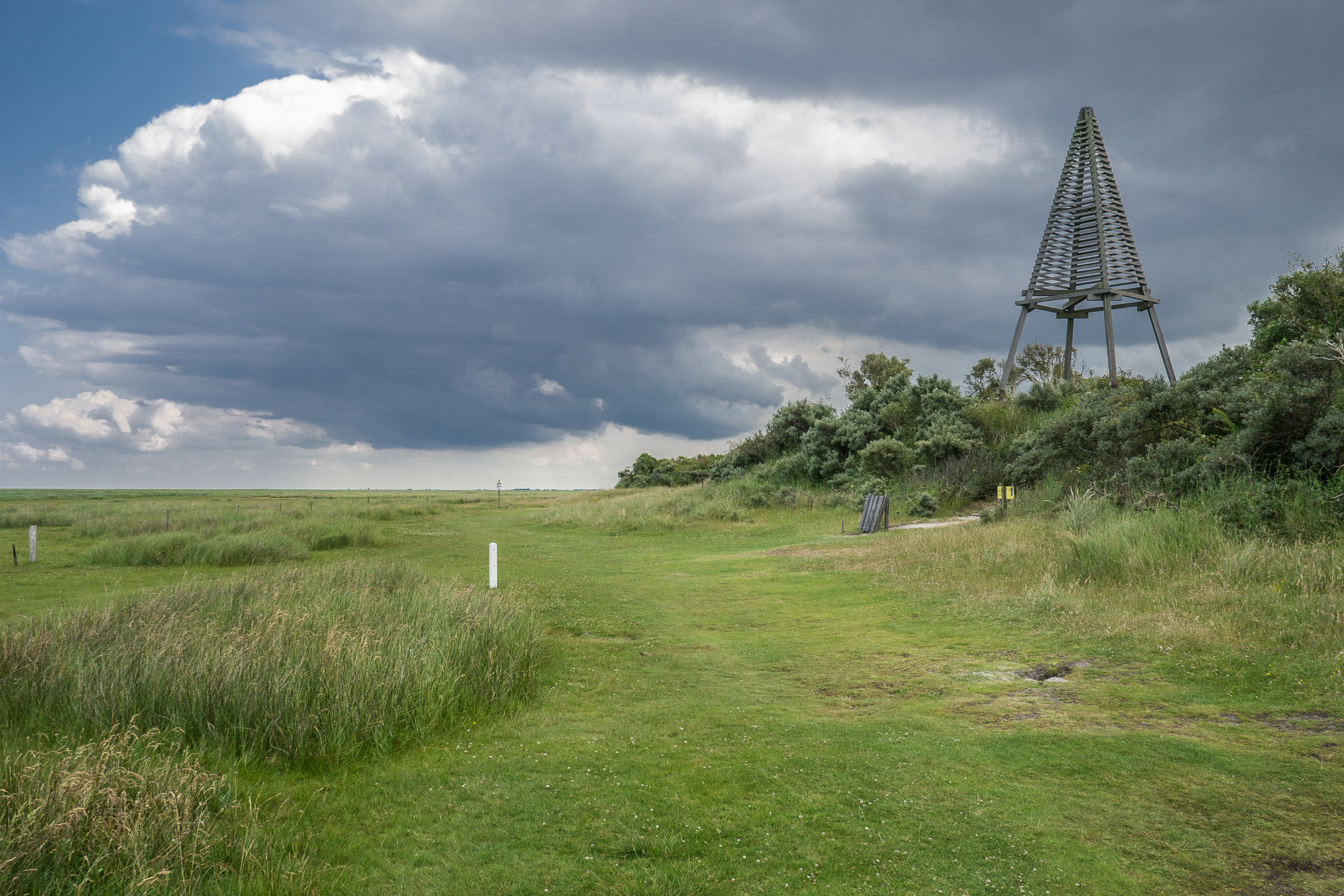
A daymark for shipping, Kobbeduinen

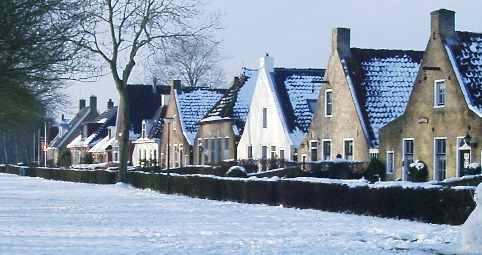
Langestreek
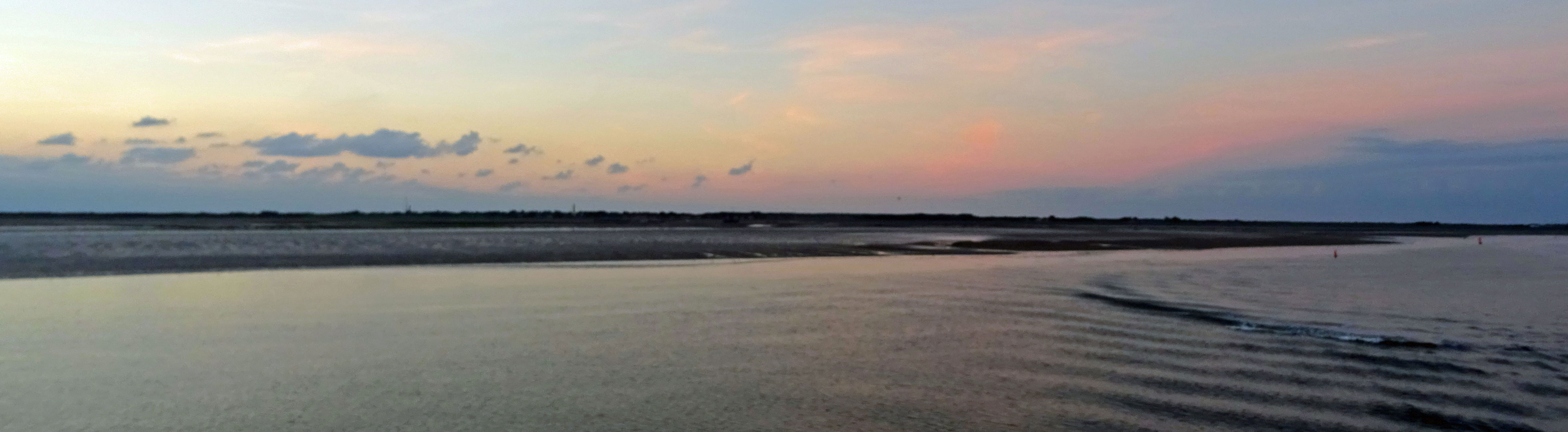
Schiermonnikoog by evening

== Travel ==
The only public transport to Schiermonnikoog is a ferry from the lock and harbour complex of Lauwersoog. Even during the winter months, there are more than two connections per day.

Tourists are not allowed to bring their cars with them on the ferry. Buses connect the village with the ferry. The most common form of transport is by bicycle; a network of cycle paths criss-crosses the island and two bicycle rental companies provide roughly 5,000 bicycles for tourists.

Due to environment and health concerns, since 2013 six Chinese electric buses BYD ebus (range of about 250 km) are the only buses on the island for at least the 15-year contract period (BYD won the contract, beating its European opponents).

== Notable people ==
- Albertus Bruins Slot (1865–1930), politician, former mayor of Schiermonnikoog (1896–1901)
- Bas Eenhoorn (born 1946), politician, former mayor of Schiermonnikoog (1976–1983)
- Agnes Fenenga (1874–1949), missionary teacher in Turkiye; born in Schiermonnikoog

== See also ==
- Klozum
