= Lordship of Ameland =

Territory in the Holy Roman Empire

Lordship of Ameland Vrije heerlijkheid Ameland (Dutch) Frije Hearlikheid It Amelân (West Frisian)
- 1424–1795
- Flag Coat of arms

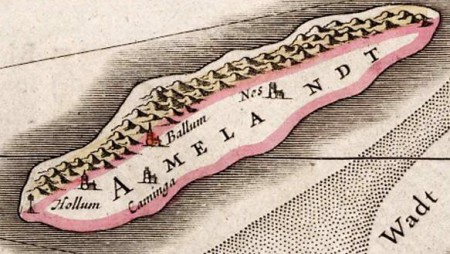
- Ameland around 1662, by Joan Blaeu
- Status: Lordship of the Holy Roman Empire (1424–1795)
- Capital: Ballum
- Common languages: West Frisian (until the 18th century); Ameland Dutch (from the 18th century)
- Religion: Calvinism; Catholicism; Anabaptism
- Government: Feudal monarchy
- Lord of Ameland
  - 1424–1450: Ritske I (first lord)
  - 1450–1463: Romke I and Keimpe I
  - 1463–1486: Hajo I
  - 1486–1521: Pieter I
  - 1521–1552: Wytzo I
  - 1552–1575: Pieter II
  - 1575–1624: Sicco I
  - 1624–1638: Pieter III
  - 1638–1641: Wytzo II
  - 1641–1668: Watse I
  - 1668–1680: Frans Duco I
  - 1680–1681: Rixt van Donia
  - 1681–1704: Wilco I
  - 1704–1795: Princes of Orange
- Historical era: Middle Ages; Early modern era
  - Ritske Jelmera declares himself 'Lord of Ameland': 1424
  - Incorporation of the Lordship into the Batavian Republic: 1795
Preceded by	Succeeded by
Eastergoa	Batavian Republic
- Today part of: Netherlands

The Lordship of Ameland (Dutch: Vrije Heerlijkheid Ameland; West Frisian: Frije Hearlikheid It Amelân) was an allodial lordship on the present-day island of Ameland. Formally, the island had been in the possession of the House of Egmond since 1398. However, actual power had been in the hands of the Cammingha dynasty since 1424. In that year, the Frisian chieftain Ritske Jelmera began to call himself 'lord of Ameland' and acted as a representative of the island's population. The island would remain in the possession of the Van Cammingha's until 1681. Through the Thoe Schwartzenberg en Hohenlansberg family, the island subsequently came into the possession of the Prince of Orange in 1704. The island would then remain a free lordship until 1795, after which it was incorporated into the Batavian Republic. Today, 'Lord of Ameland' is still one of the titles of King Willem-Alexander of the Netherlands.

== History ==
=== Origin of the free lordship ===
The isolated position of Ameland meant that it could easily be taken in the later Middle Ages, when the Counts of Holland wanted to conquer Friesland west of the Lauwers, consisting of Westergoa, Eastergoa and Bornegoa. In 1398, the Count Albert I of Holland leased Ameland and Het Bildt to Arnold I of Egmond, lord of IJsselstein. In 1445, the declaration of Hartwerd confirmed that Ameland had no ties with Ferwerderadeel or the rest of Friesland. The Egmonts would remain feudal lords of Ameland until 1670. However, the actual power was in the hands of the Camminghas. A lawsuit that the Egmonts brought against the Camminghas came to nothing; no verdict was given.

=== Ameland under the Van Cammingha's ===
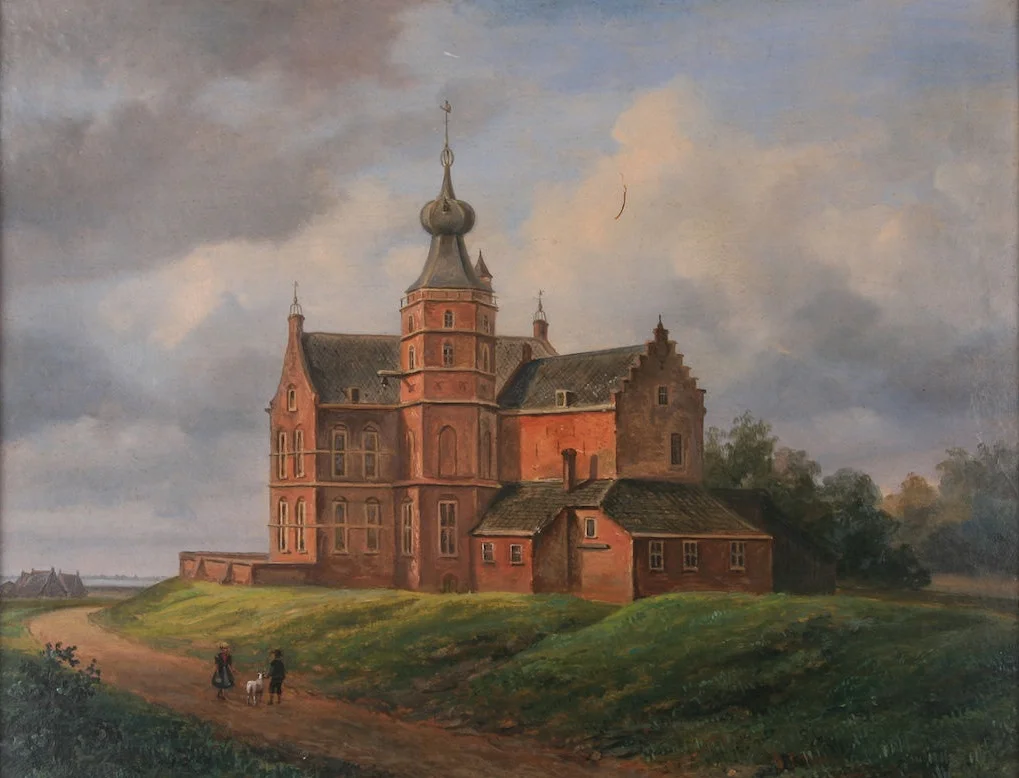
Castle of the Van Cammingha's in Ballum

From 1424, Ritske Jelmera Cammingha acted as representative of the people of Ameland. He proclaimed himself 'lord of Ameland', which as such formed a 'Free or Allodial Lordship', and concluded an agreement with the Count of Holland in 1429. The Camminghas had a rather remarkable feudal ideology and instituted exceptional laws and punishments. There was therefore no real freedom for the population. For example, cat owners had to cut off the ears of their pets so that, as was claimed, these cats would not be able to enter rabbit holes.

When the Burgundian Circle was founded in 1512, Ameland was not part of it; it remained part of the Westphalian Circle. However, it was not part of Friesland or Holland, but was an independent part of the Holy Roman Empire. It remained neutral in both the Eighty Years' War and the First Anglo-Dutch War.

=== Property of the Prince of Orange ===
Although Holland, Friesland and the Holy Roman Emperor disputed this quasi-independent status, the island remained a free lordship until 1680, when the Ameland branch of the Cammingha family died out. The island came to the Thoe Schwartzenberg en Hohenlansberg family, who sold it in 1704 to Henriëtte Amalia of Anhalt-Dessau, through whom it came to the Orange-Nassaus.

=== Annexation by the Batavian Republic ===
In 1795, Ameland lost its independence. Its rights as an allodial lordship were abolished, and representatives of the province of Friesland regarded Ameland as conquered territory and took over the administration. However, they encountered much opposition, and the administration was carefully concealed. It was not until 1801 that Ameland became part of the Batavian Republic and was incorporated into the Department of Friesland.

After the French period and the foundation of the United Kingdom of the Netherlands in 1815, the island became part of the province of Friesland, and its status as a lordship was partly restored. Ameland became a grietenij, the Frisian predecessor of the municipality, of Friesland, and when the municipal law was introduced, the grietenijen became municipalities. The kings and queens of the Netherlands still maintain the title of 'Lord of Ameland' today.

== See also ==
- Lordship of Frisia
- Ameland
- Cammingha
- History of Frisia
