= Camminghaslot =

Former castle on the isle of Ameland in the Netherlands

Coordinates: 53.4416°N 5.6876°E

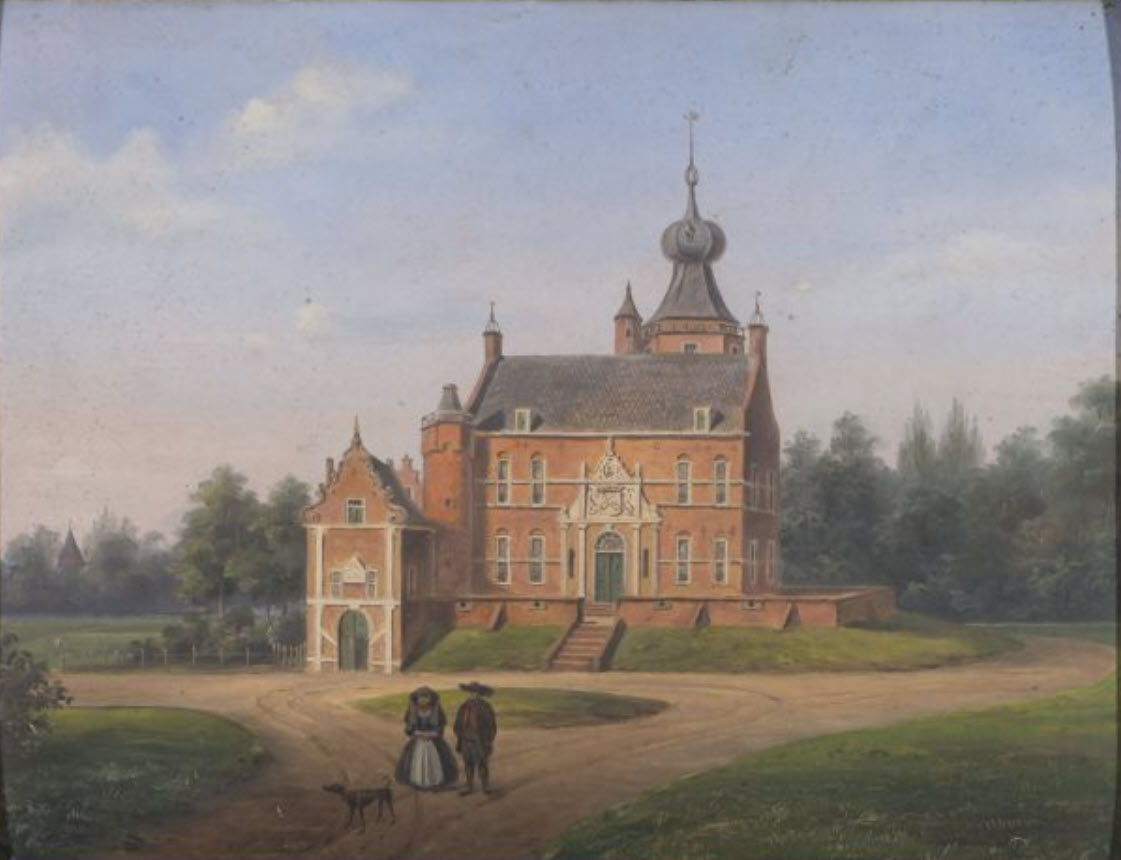
Camminghaslot by Willem Troost (1874)

The Camminghaslot (also known historically as Jelmera State or Jelmera Stins) was a Renaissance-style castle located in the village of Ballum on the Dutch island of Ameland. Originally built in the early 15th century, it served as the seat of the influential Van Cammingha family, who ruled Ameland as free and hereditary lords (Vrij- en Erfheren van Ameland). The castle remained in use until the early 19th century and was demolished in 1828. Today, the site is occupied by the Ballum town hall, and remnants of the castle's history, including the chapel’s cemetery and tombstones, remain visible.

== History ==
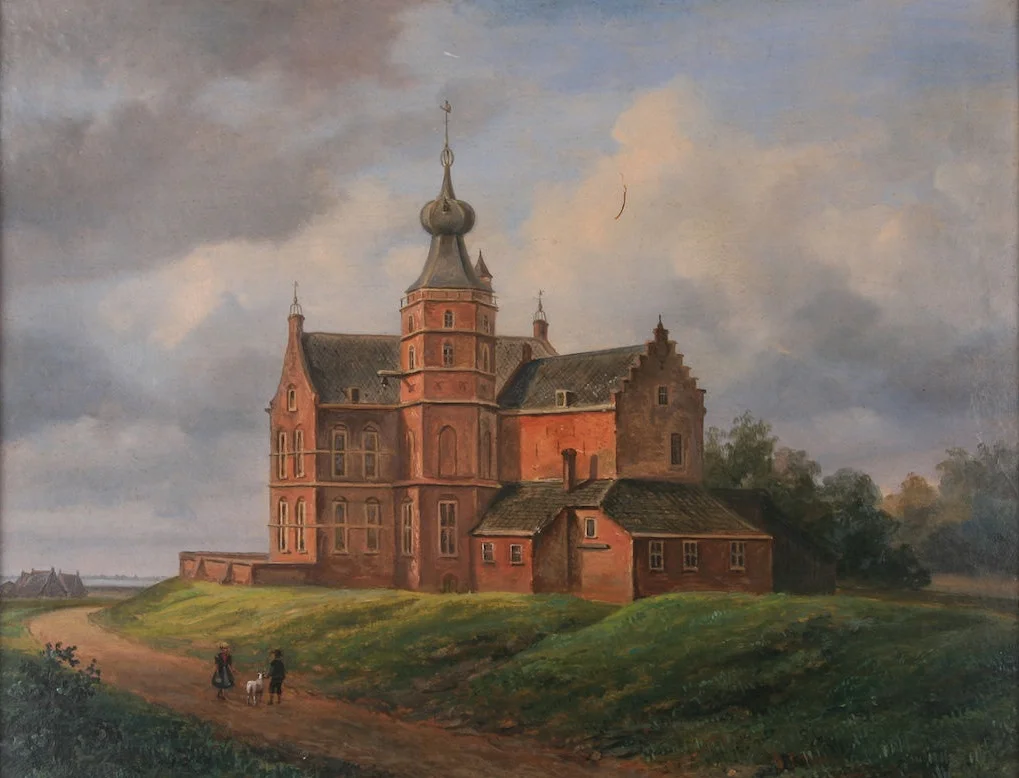
Camminghaslot seen from the back

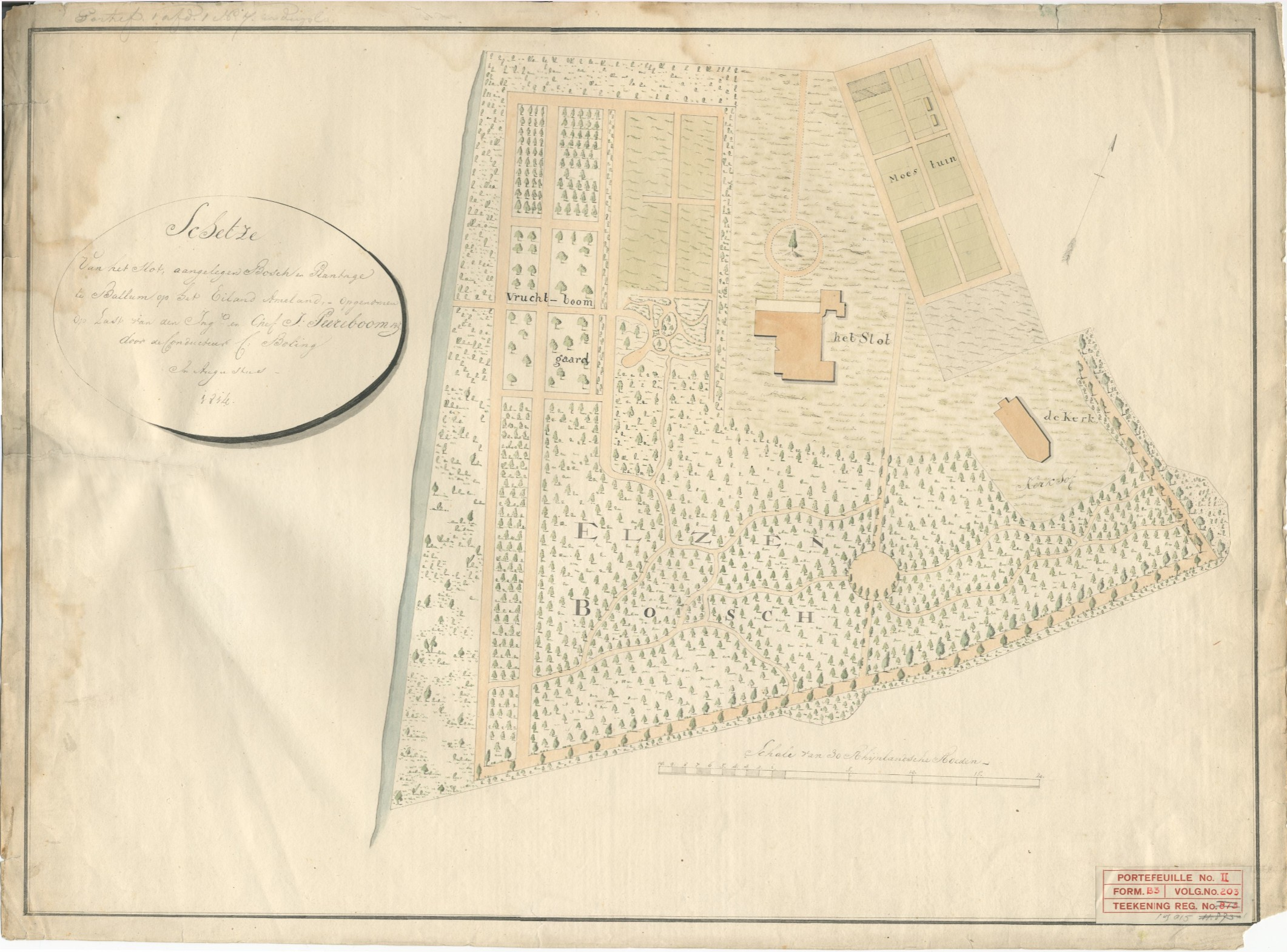
Plan of the Camminghaslot and its surrounding gardens

=== Origins ===
The first known structure on the site of Camminghaslot was a stins (a type of fortified Frisian stone house), built around 1424 by Ritske Jelmera, a nobleman from Ternaard who settled on Ameland in 1405. Jelmera became the de facto ruler of the island and is considered the progenitor of the Van Cammingha family. The original house was known as Jelmera Stins, later referred to as Jelmera State.

Jelmera’s grandson Haije Donia, who married the widow of Sicke Cammingha, adopted the Cammingha name. By the late 15th century, the family began to refer to their residence as Camminghaslot, and their political influence expanded over Ameland.

=== Feudal disputes and legal battles ===
The Camminghas’ claim to Ameland was challenged multiple times over the centuries, particularly by the Counts of Egmond, who possessed a feudal grant allegedly issued in 1398 by Count Albert of Bavaria. However, legal attempts to assert control over the island failed, notably in a 1527 lawsuit against Wytze van Cammingha, and later in 1697, when another Count of Egmond again unsuccessfully claimed rights to the island.

Further disputes arose in the 17th century, most notably involving Ernst Zuhm, a German nobleman married to a Cammingha daughter. Zuhm obtained a feudal charter from the Holy Roman Emperor, claiming the Camminghas had failed to uphold their vassalage. Despite decades of legal battles and a failed military expedition organized by Count von Königseck in the 1670s, the Camminghas—backed by the States of Friesland and Holland —retained their hold over Ameland.

=== Reconstruction and peak ===
In 1604, the castle was extensively rebuilt by Sicke van Cammingha and his wife Catherina van Herema, who transformed it into a stately home in the Dutch Renaissance style, also known as northern Mannerism, rich in decorative elements. The new building was significantly larger and more elaborate than its predecessor and comparable in scale and style to the Poptaslot (also known as Heringa State) in Marsum. The castle became the most prominent noble residence on the island, surrounded by formal gardens and a woodland of oak and birch.

Due to the absence of local building materials, bricks had to be imported by barge across the Wadden Sea, significantly increasing construction costs.

=== Decline and demolition ===
The Van Cammingha family line ended with the death of Frans Duco van Cammingha. His mother, Rixt van Donia, continued to reside in the castle until her death in 1681. The estate and the family’s vast holdings in Leeuwarden passed to the Thoe Schwartzenberg and Hohenlansberg family, who in 1704 sold the island and castle for 170,000 guilders to Princess Henriëtta Amalia of Anhalt-Dessau. She purchased it for her son, John William Friso, Prince of Orange, hereditary Stadtholder of Friesland. His descendant, King Willem-Alexander of the Netherlands, continues to hold the historical title “Free and Hereditary Lord of Ameland.”

After the French Revolution, the property was confiscated in 1795. Ameland became a Grietenij (municipal district) in 1802. The first Grietman, Baron Walraven Robert van Heeckeren from Overijssel, lived in the castle until 1828, when it was declared uninhabitable. The baron moved to an official residence in Nes, and the castle was demolished in July 1828. Its materials were sold for 1,250 guilders to Jan Scheltema of Nes. The Ballum town hall now stands on the site where the castle once stood.

=== Legacy ===
Although the building no longer exists, Camminghaslot remains a significant part of Ameland’s history and the broader narrative of Frisian nobility. The castle and its residents played a central role in the island’s governance, economy, and architectural heritage. Surviving illustrations, as well as an 1814 garden plan by C. Boling, provide valuable visual documentation.

The site today retains symbolic value as the location of Ballum’s town hall and serves as a historical reference point for visitors and researchers interested in Frisian aristocratic culture.

In 2017, a foundation was established by a group of enthusiastic island residents with the aim of reconstructing the castle. Although a preliminary plan was developed, it was ultimately deemed unfeasible at the time. The initiative remains a long-term aspiration, with the plans temporarily shelved but not abandoned.

== Architecture ==
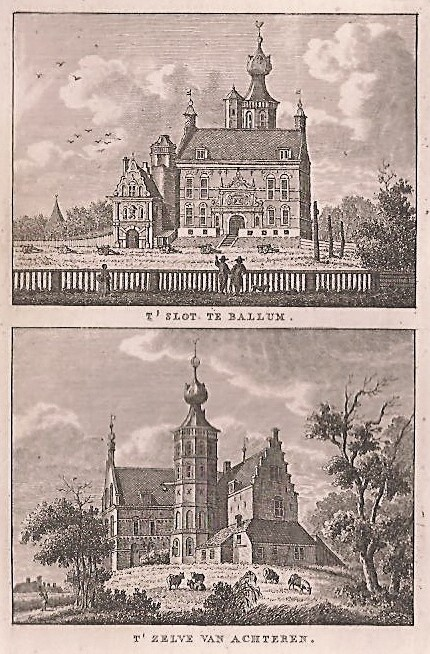
18th century engraving by Jan Bulthuis

The Camminghaslot featured an L-shaped floor plan, consisting of two wings with gable roofs. The main wing had stepped gables, while the shorter wing included a plain gable. At the inner corner stood a five-story octagonal tower, topped with a balustrade and a slender onion-domed spire.

The facade included cross-windows and a grand entrance framed by columns, niches, and a coat-of-arms panel. A separate gatehouse served as a ceremonial entry rather than a defensive structure and featured a round-arched gateway flanked by pilasters, arched windows on the upper level, and a pediment likely bearing the Cammingha coat of arms.

The castle grounds contained Ameland’s only ornamental garden, and the adjacent woodland formed a striking landscape element on the otherwise treeless island.

== Chapel and burial site ==
Behind the castle stood a chapel that also served as Ballum’s village church. On the cemetery site, the outline of the chapel remains visible, marked by a path of seashells surrounding the bier house. Inside, visitors can see the tombstone of Wytze van Cammingha, a well-preserved remnant of the family’s historical presence.

== Gallery ==
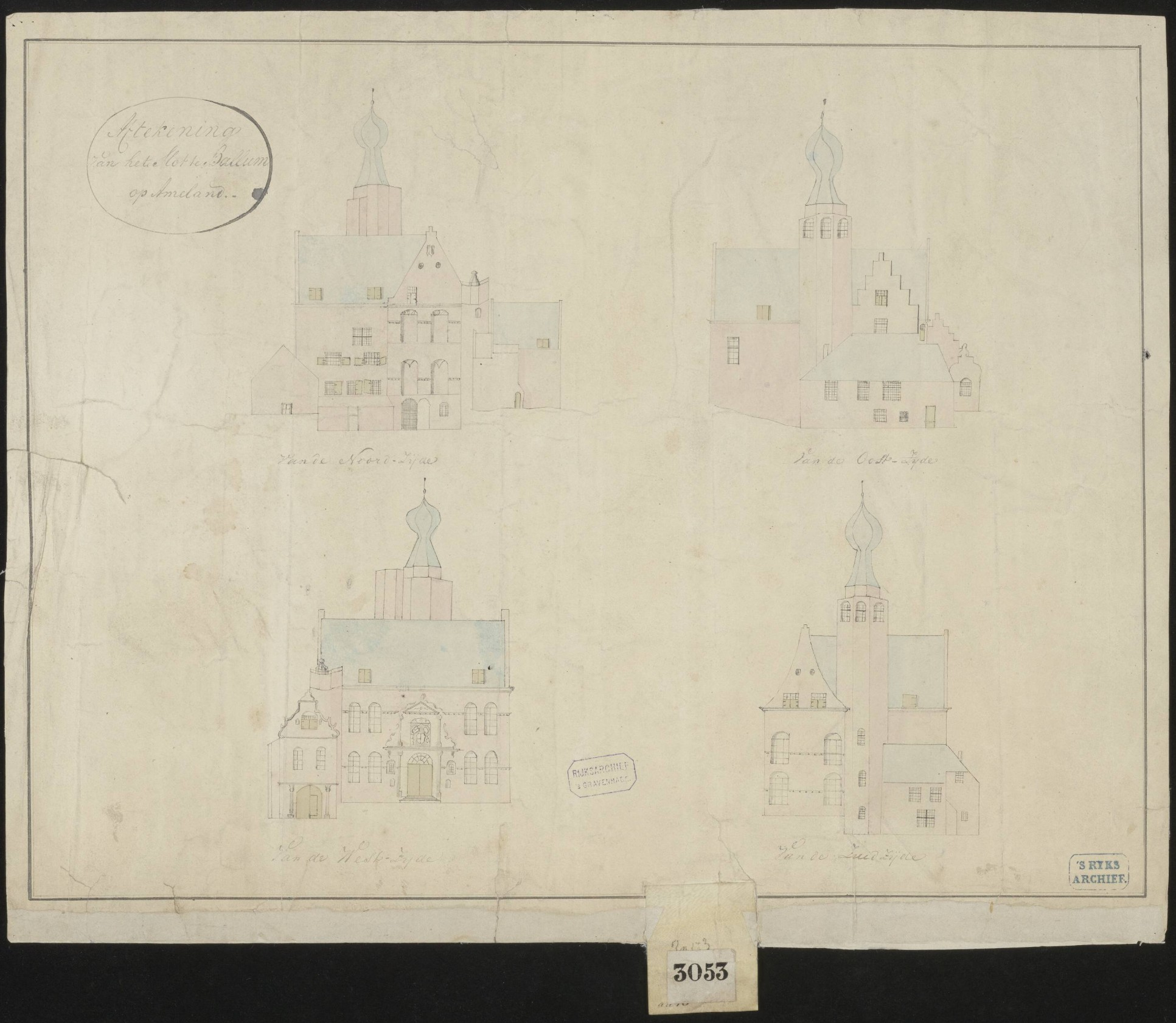
Various views of the Camminghaslot

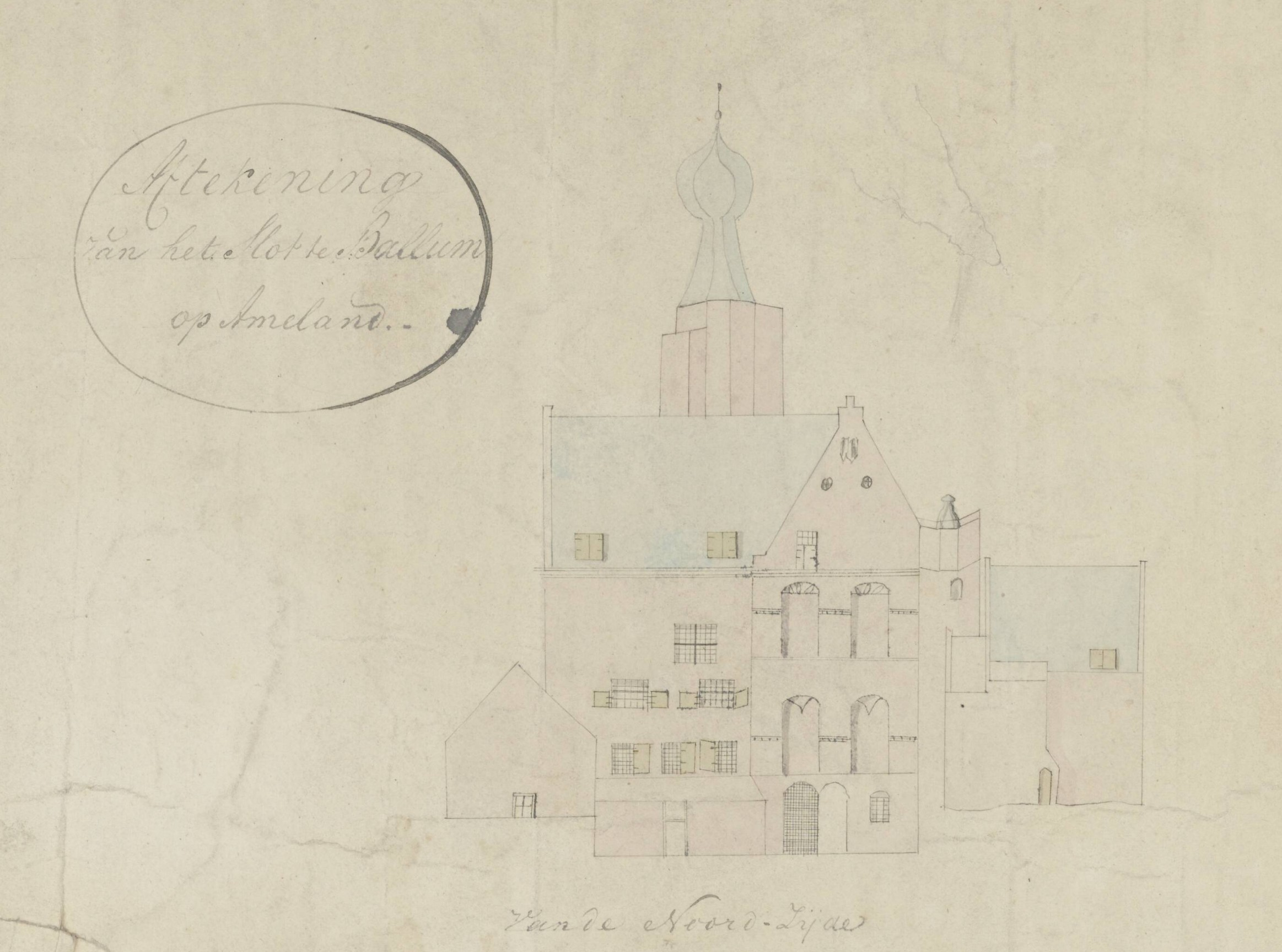
The north side

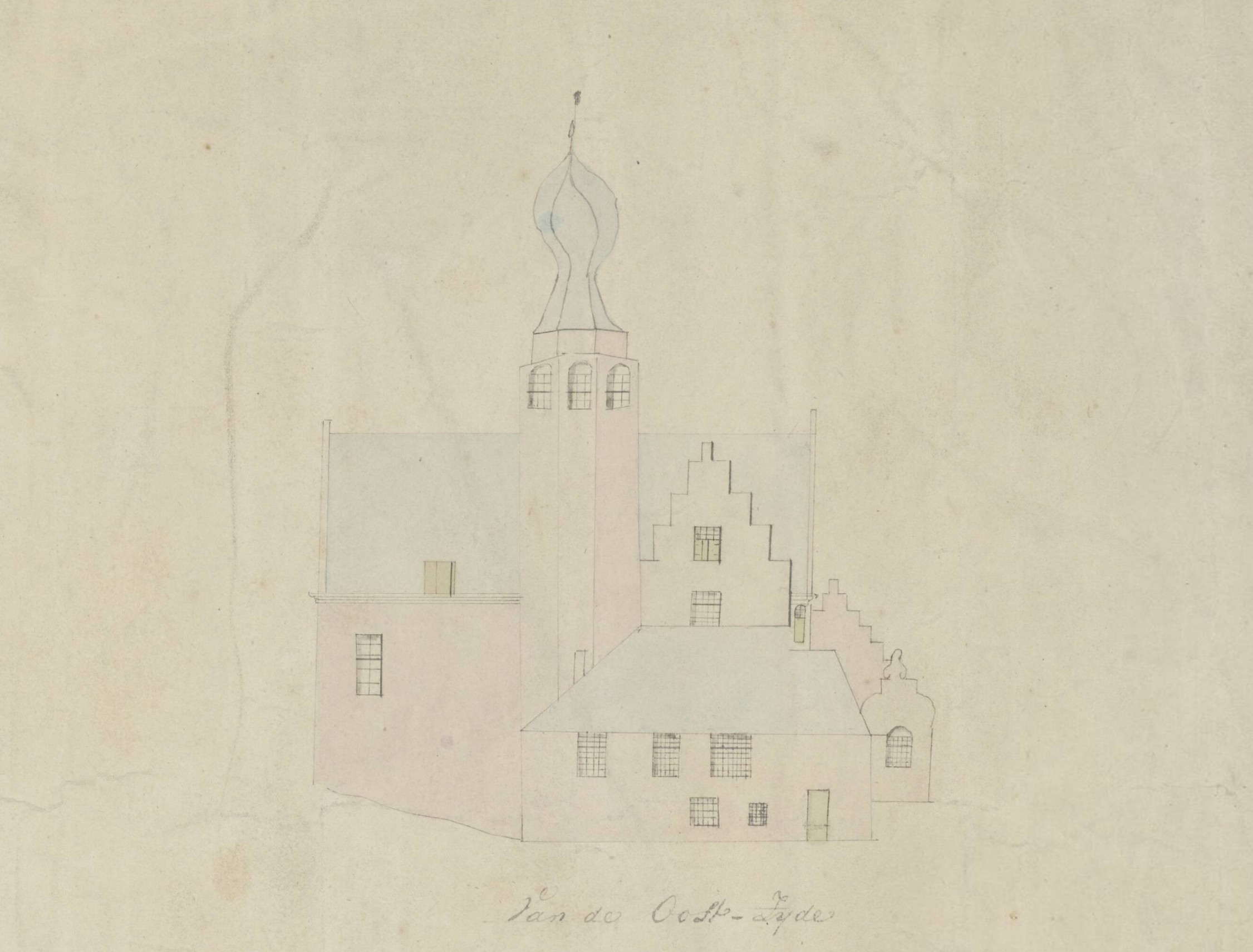
East side

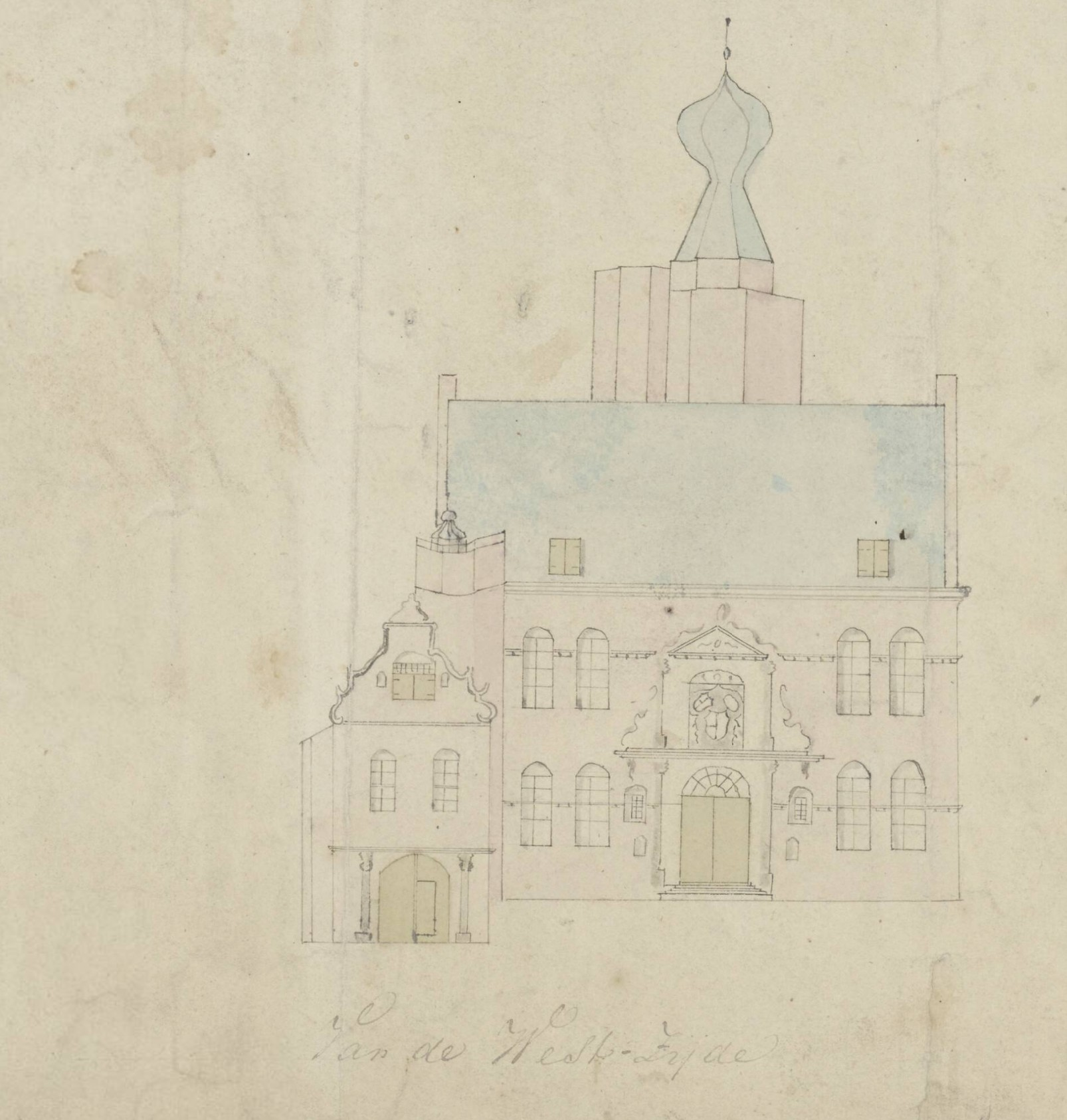
West side

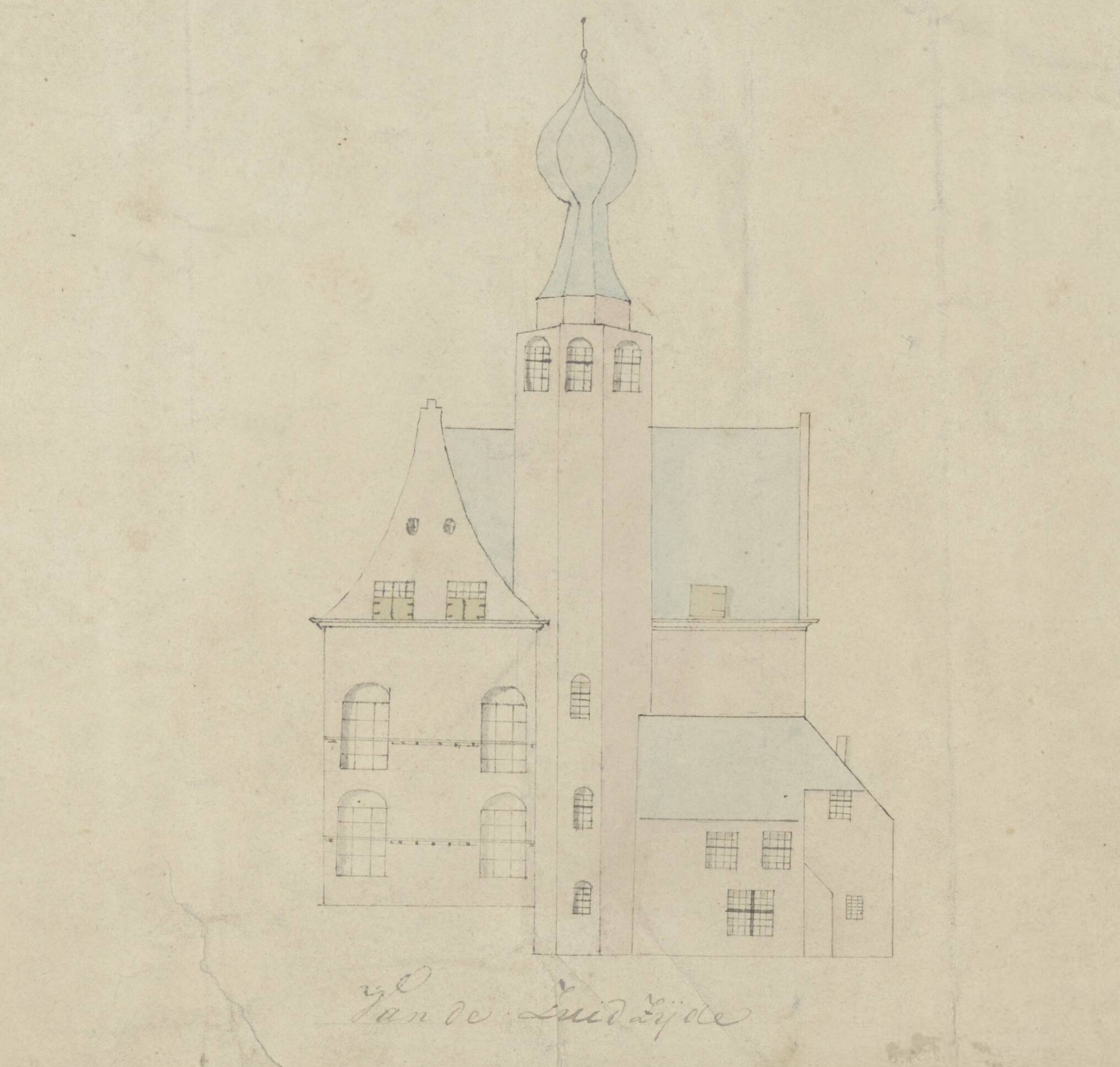
South side

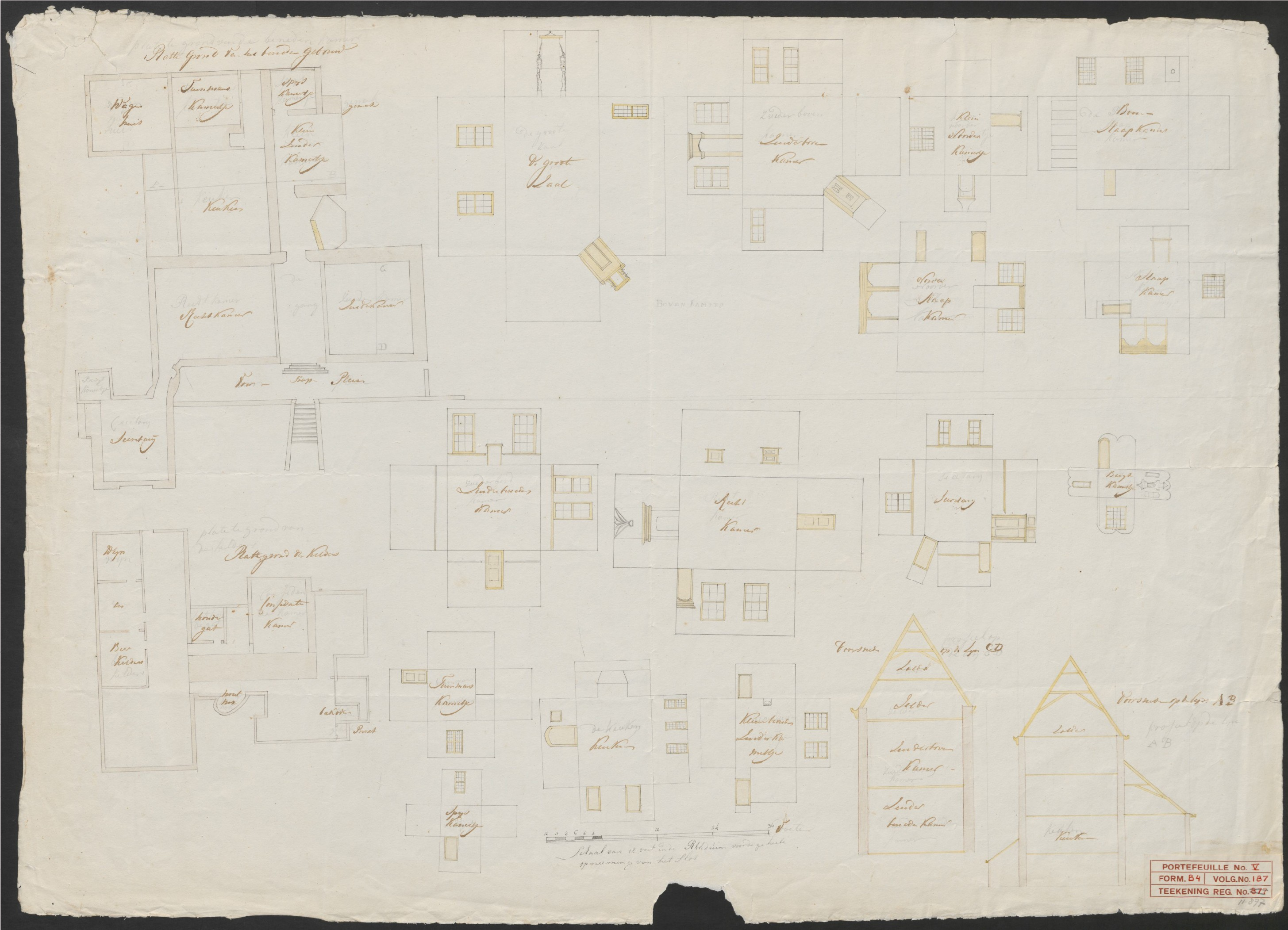
Floor plans

== Literature ==
- Ronald Elward en Peter Karstkarel (1990). Stinsen en States Adellijk wonen in Friesland. Drachten Leeuwarden: Friese Pers Boekerij bv. pp. 162–163. ISBN 978-9033002342.
- Jan Giezen (2017). Het Slot van Ballum de geschiedenis van het Camminghaslot zichtbaar gemaakt. Hollum: MooiePlatenMakers. ISBN 978-90-814702-2-3.
