= Ritske Jelmera =

Frisian chieftain

Ritske Jelmera was a Frisian chieftain born in about 1383 in Ternaard, Friesland, who ruled the island of Ameland before dying in 1450 (testated January 17). His stins (stone house) stood near Ballum, the Jelmera State. His descendants through his great-grandson Pieter went by the family name Cammingha.

== Sources and references ==
- Burmania, Upcke van, Frisicae nobilitatis genealogia, Rijksarchief Friesland, Leeuwarden, Van Eysinga-Vegelin van Claerbergen Family Archive, inventory no. 1323b.
- Verhoeven, G., J.A. Mol, and H. Bremer, Friese Testamenten tot 1550, Leeuwarden: Fryske Akademy, 1994.
