= Buren, Friesland =

Buren
- Village
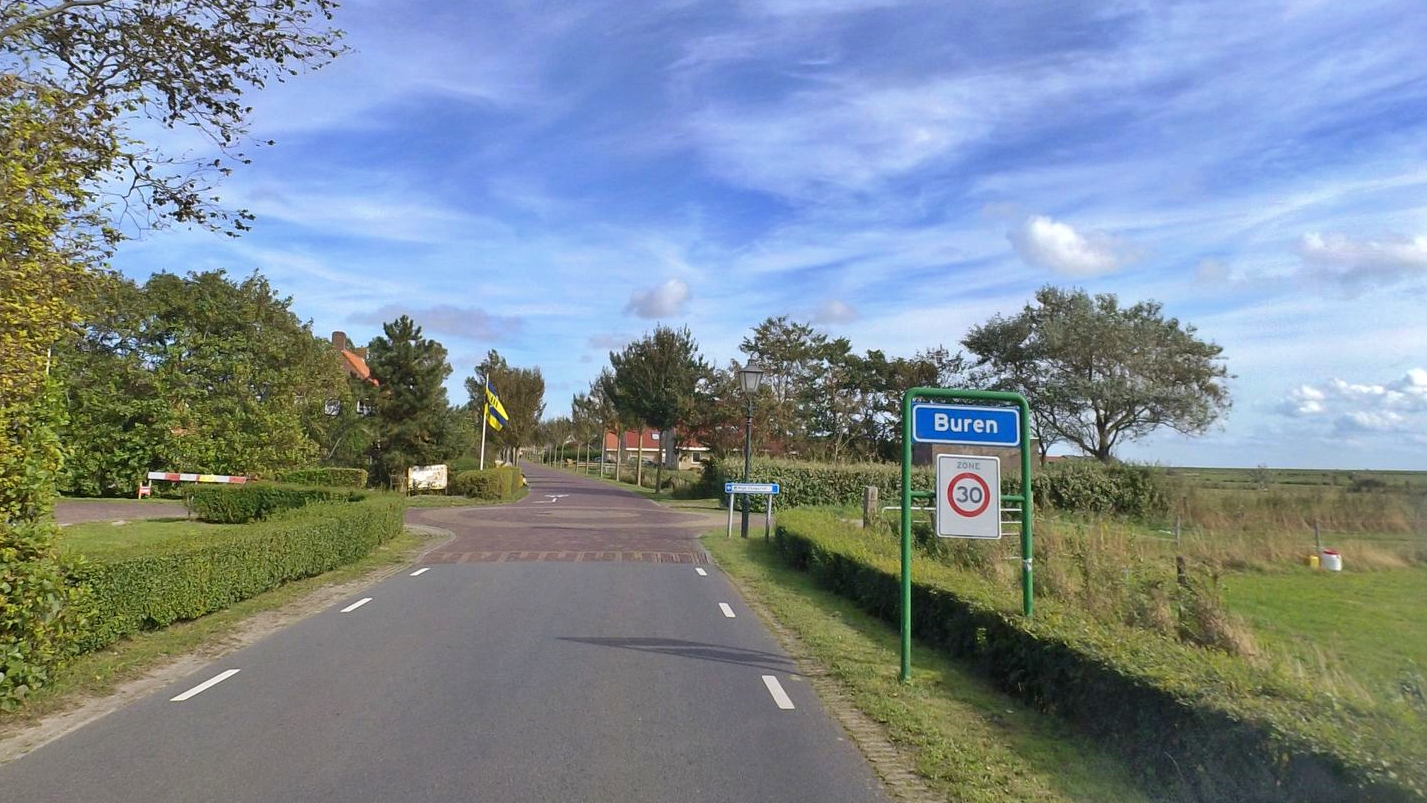
- Buren

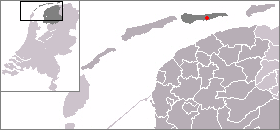
- Location in Ameland municipality

- Location in the province of Friesland Buren (Netherlands)
- Country: Netherlands
- Province: Friesland
- Municipality: Ameland

Area
  - Total: 21.43 km^{2} (8.27 sq mi)
- Elevation: 3.7 m (12 ft)

Population (2021)
  - Total: 740
  - Density: 35/km^{2} (89/sq mi)
- Time zone: UTC+1 (CET)
  - Summer (DST): UTC+2 (CEST)
- Postal code: 9164
- Dialing code: 0519

Buren (Dutch pronunciation: [ˈbyːrə(n)]) is the easternmost village on the island of Ameland, one of the West Frisian Islands and part of the Netherlands. Buren had, as of January 2017, a population of 715.

== History ==
The village was first mentioned in the late 11th century as Buren, and means neighbourhood. Buren developed in the Late Middle Ages around a village square. It was originally a Catholic village. Buren was home to 147 people in 1840.

== Rixt van het Oerd ==
Buren is also home to the infamous legend of the witch Rixt van het Oerd (e.g. Rixt of Oerd). This old lady would tie a lantern on a cow who she would chase into the dunes. She would hope for a ship to mistake the cow for a lighthouse, thinking it was a safe haven. Instead the ship would run aground on the sand bars along the coastline, leaving its cargo for her to pick up from the beach. One day in a heavy storm, she practiced her reckless way of making extra money and encountered the dead body of a drowned sailor. As she came closer she realized that it was her own son, Sjoerd. After realizing what she has done, every time there is now a storm raging over Ameland, she howls out her son's name in the wind.

In remembrance of the legend of Rixt van het Oerd, there is a small statue in the center of Buren.

500 years ago the population consisted of pirates and bandits, today the residents live from the tourist industry (school classes from Germany visit Ameland and stay at Buren).

== Gallery ==
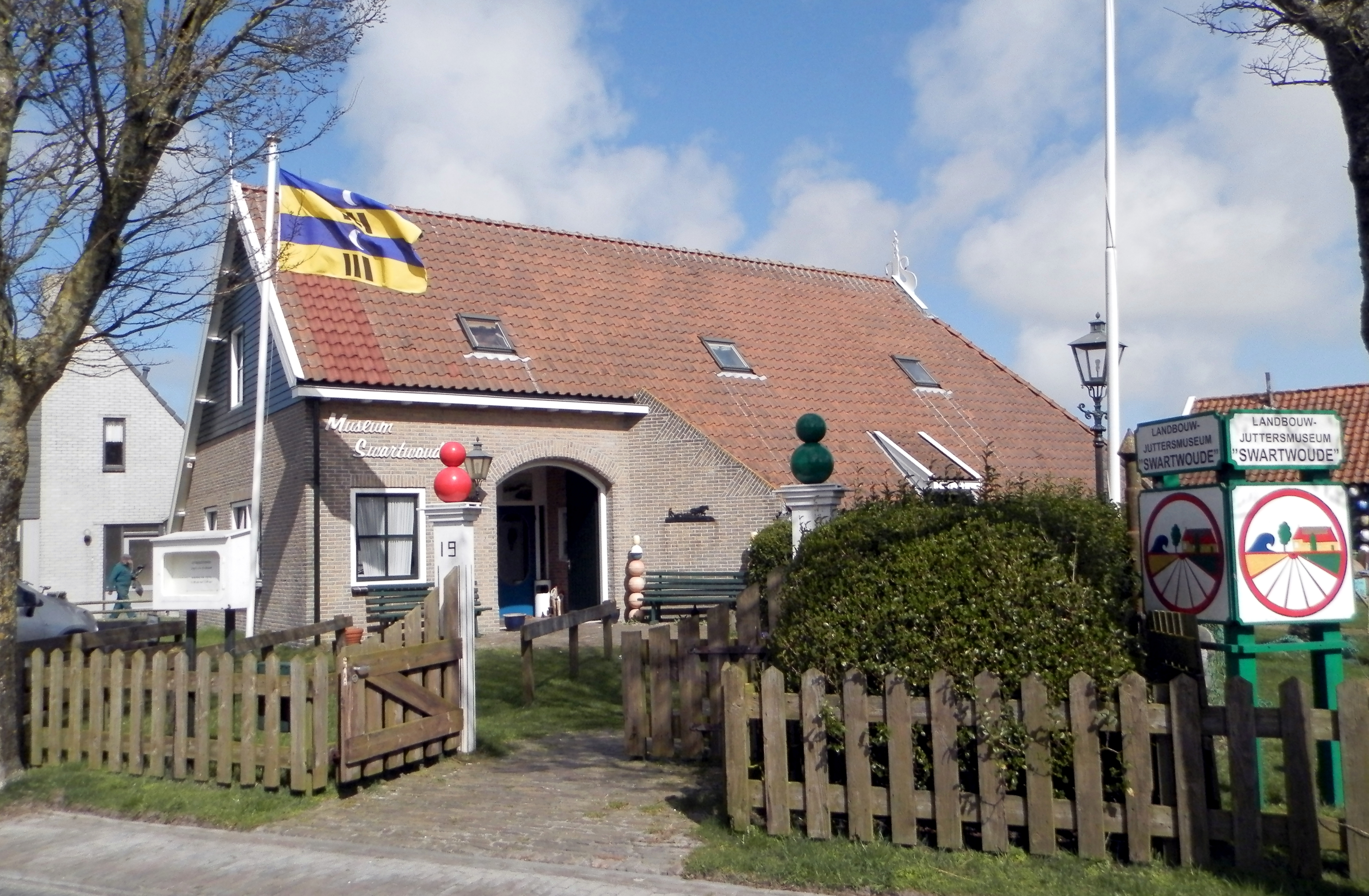
Agriculture and beachcombing museum

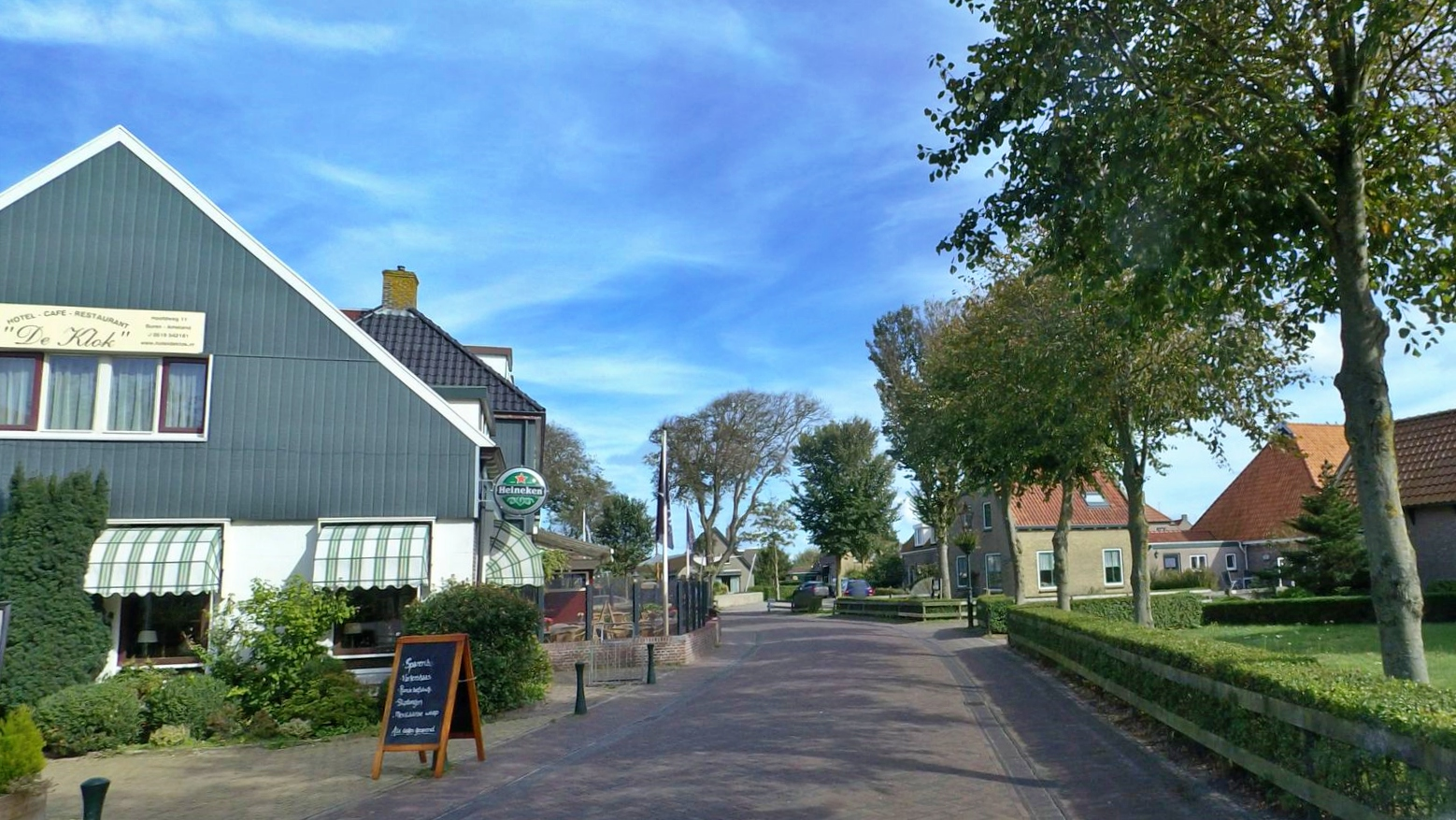
Street in Buren

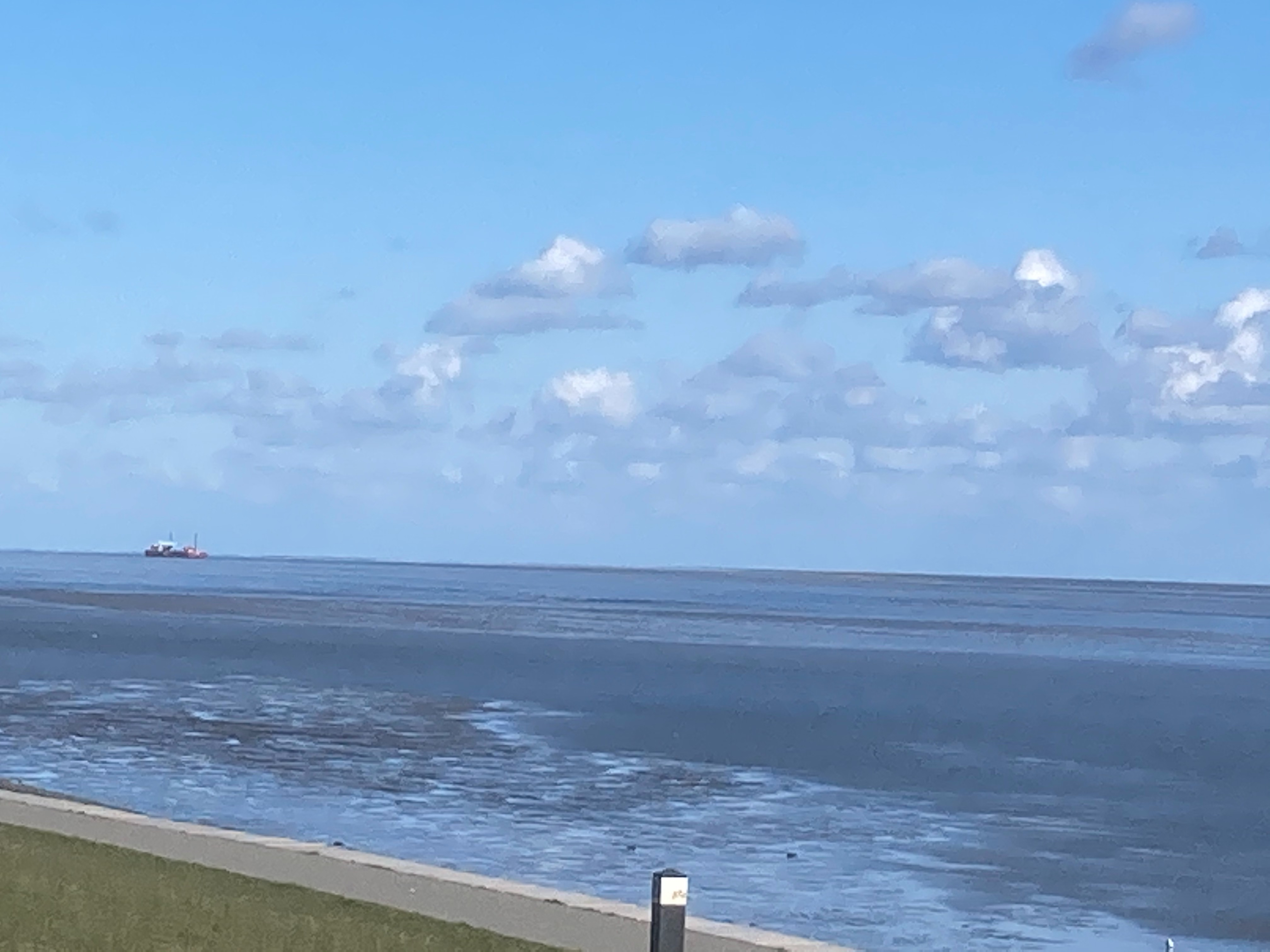
Sea view
