= Pieter Mosterman =

Dutch computer scientist (born 1967)

Pieter J. Mosterman
- Born: March 16, 1967 (age 59); Nes, Ameland, Netherlands
- Education: University of Twente and Vanderbilt University
- Occupations: Scientist, professor, public speaker, inventor
- Known for: Scientific contributions to Modeling and Simulation, Public Speeches, Inventions
- Awards: IMechE Donald Julius Groen Prize; The Society for Modeling and Simulation International (SCS) Distinguished Service Award
- Scientific career
- Fields: Computational science and engineering
- Workplaces: MathWorks, McGill University

Pieter Johannes Mosterman (born March 16, 1967) was Chief Research Scientist and Director of the MathWorks Advanced Research & Technology Office (MARTO) at MathWorks in Natick, Massachusetts. He also holds an Adjunct Professorship at the School of Computer Science at McGill University in Montreal, Canada. His primary research interests are in Computer Automated Multiparadigm Modeling with principal applications in design automation, training systems, and fault detection, isolation, and reconfiguration.

== Early life ==
He was born in Nes on the island Ameland off the coast of the Netherlands. In 1985 Pieter Mosterman started the B.Sc. program at the University of Twente, which he received in 1987, followed by his M.Sc. in electrical engineering from the Control Laboratory in 1991. In 1992 he enrolled in the Ph.D. program of Vanderbilt University, Nashville, Tennessee, and graduated at the Center for Intelligent Systems in 1997 with a Ph.D. in electrical and computer engineering. His dissertation was on Hybrid Dynamic Systems: A hybrid bond graph modeling paradigm and its application in diagnosis. After graduation, during 1997–2001, Mosterman was a research associate at the German Aerospace Center (DLR) in Oberpfaffenhofen, Germany.

== Career ==
Mosterman is the editor of the CRC Press book series on "Computational Analysis, Synthesis, and Design of Dynamic Systems". He coedited:

- Model-Based Design for Embedded Systems
- Real-time Simulation Technologies, Principles, Methodologies, and Applications
- Model-Based Testing for Embedded Systems

Service activities as Associate Editor include:

- Applied Intelligence: The International Journal of Artificial Intelligence, Neural Networks, and Complex Problem-Solving Technologies,
- International Journal of Critical Computer-Based Systems,
- International Journal of Control and Automation.

Mosterman is a Member of Advisory Boards:

- for the Modeling, Simulation & Analysis Program at the Infrastructure and Geophysical Division,
- Science and Technology Directorate of the U.S. Department of Homeland Security.

Mosterman served as editor-in-chief of SIMULATION: Transactions of SCS for the Methodology section, guest editor of special issues of SIMULATION, ACM Transactions on Modeling and Computer Simulation, and IEEE Transactions on Control Systems Technology (TCST) on the topic of CAMPaM, and as associate editor of TCST. Since 2004 he has organized the annual International Bellairs CAMPaM Workshop. From 2007 through 2009 he co-organized the Model-Based Design for Embedded Systems track at the Design Automation and Test in Europe conference, and in 2009 he was general chair of a 2009 workshop on Designing for Embedded Parallel Computing Platforms: Architectures, Design Tools, and Applications. He co-organized the Computational Modeling and Simulation of Embedded Systems track at the 2007 Summer Computer Simulation Conference, the International Conference on High Level Simulation Languages and Applications in 2007, and the 14th International Workshop on Principles of Diagnosis in 2003.

Mosterman's patents include:

- Hierarchical references or links in modeling environments,
- Transparent subsystem links,
- Distributed model compilation,
- Automated approach to resolving artificial algebraic loops,
- Qualitative diagnosis system and method,
- Partitioning a model in modeling environments,
- Multi-domain unified debugger,
- Dynamic generation of formatted user interfaces in software environments, and Modeling delay using a discrete event execution modeling environment.

== Awards ==
Mosterman designed the Electronics Laboratory Simulator, nominated for The Computerworld Smithsonian Award by Microsoft Corporation in 1994.
He authored HyBrSim — A Modeling and Simulation Environment for Hybrid Bond Graphs for which he was awarded the IMechE Donald Julius Groen Prize in 2003.
He received The Society for Modeling and Simulation International (SCS) Distinguished Service Award in 2009.

== Summary ==
Pieter J. Mosterman:

- has chaired over 30 scientific events,
- served on over 100 International Program Committees,
- published over 100 peer reviewed papers,
- is inventor on over 100 awarded patents, and
- is editor of 5 books.
