= Ameland =

Municipality and island of the Netherlands

Ameland It Amelân
- Municipality
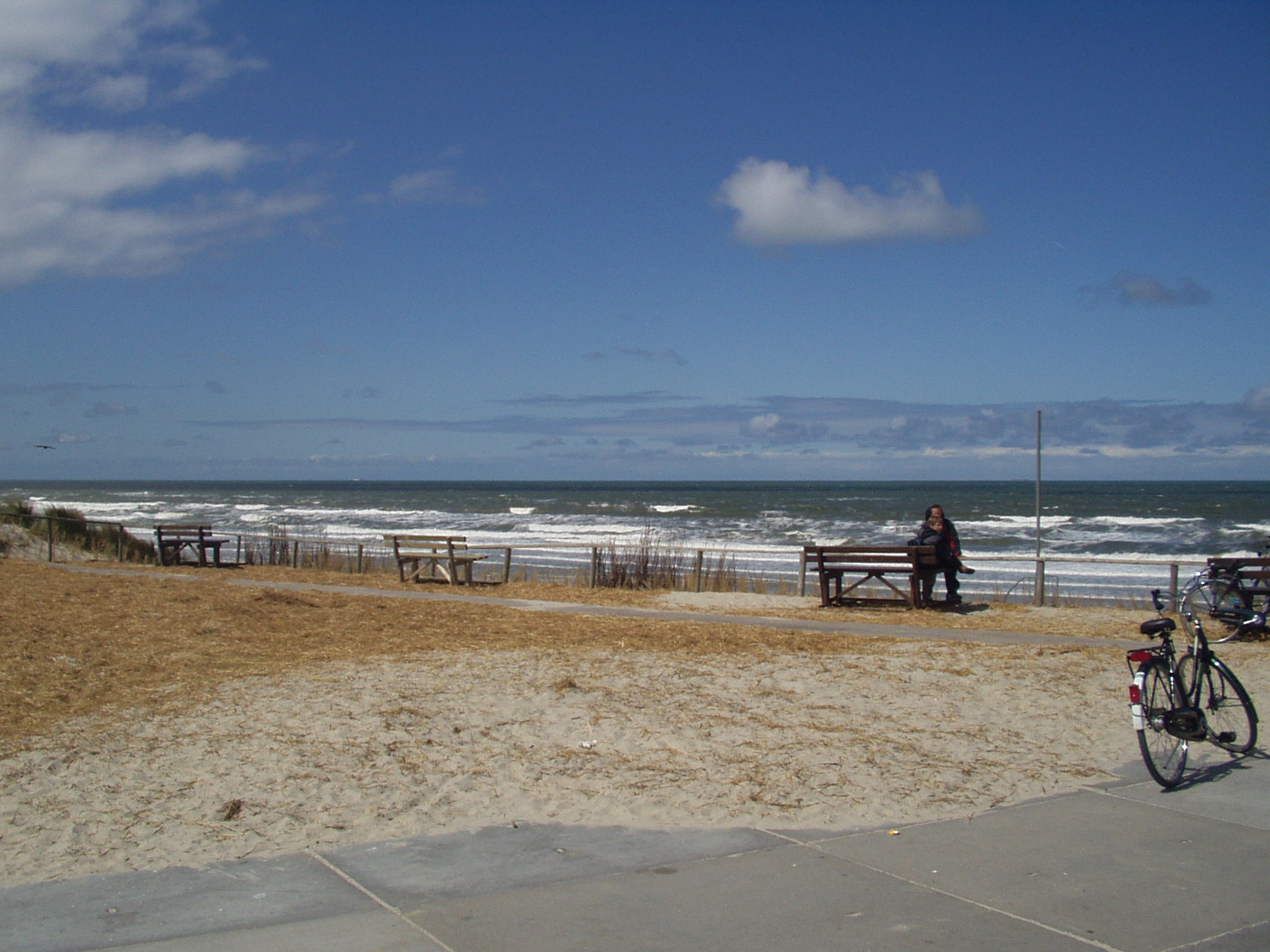
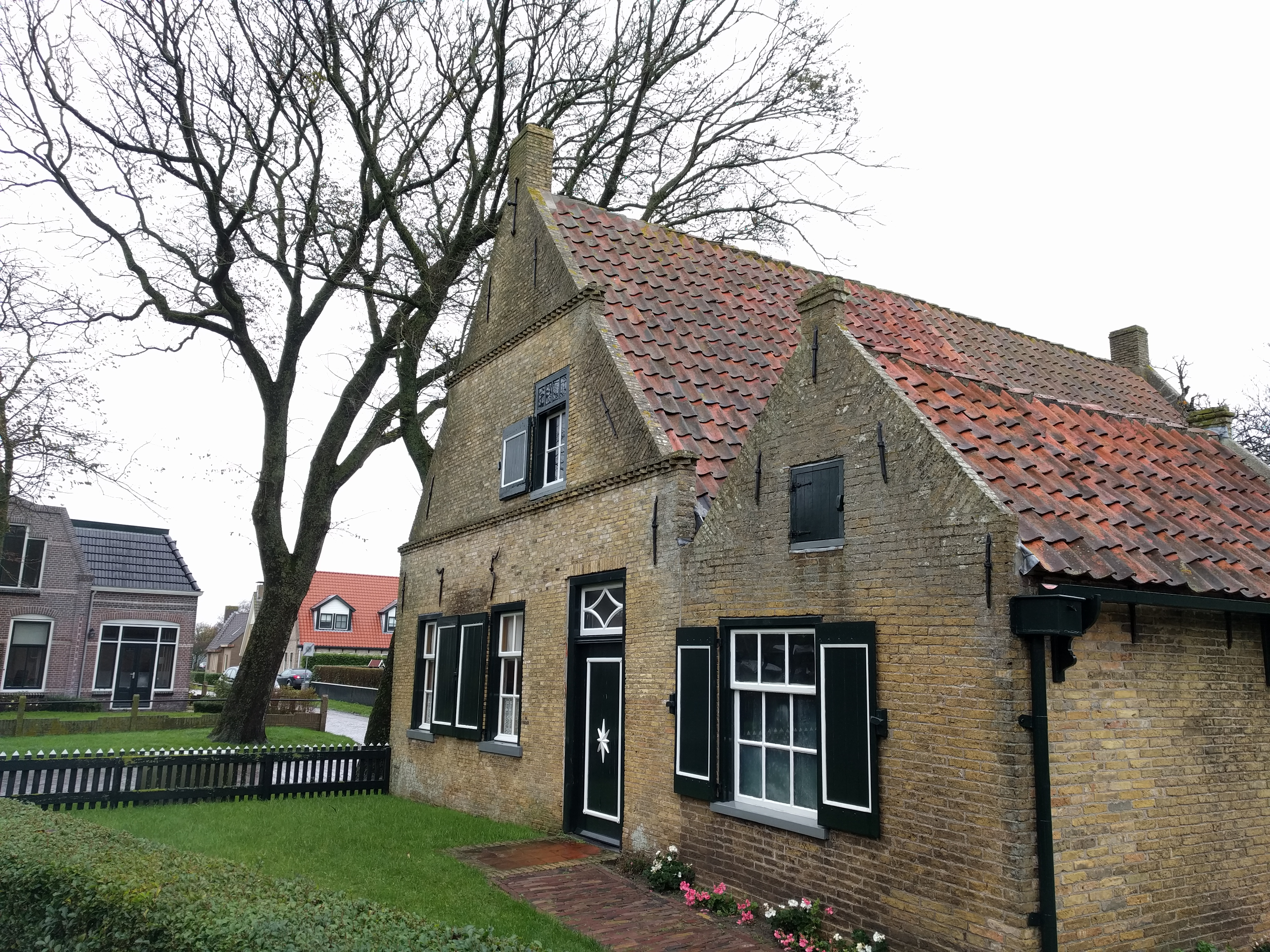
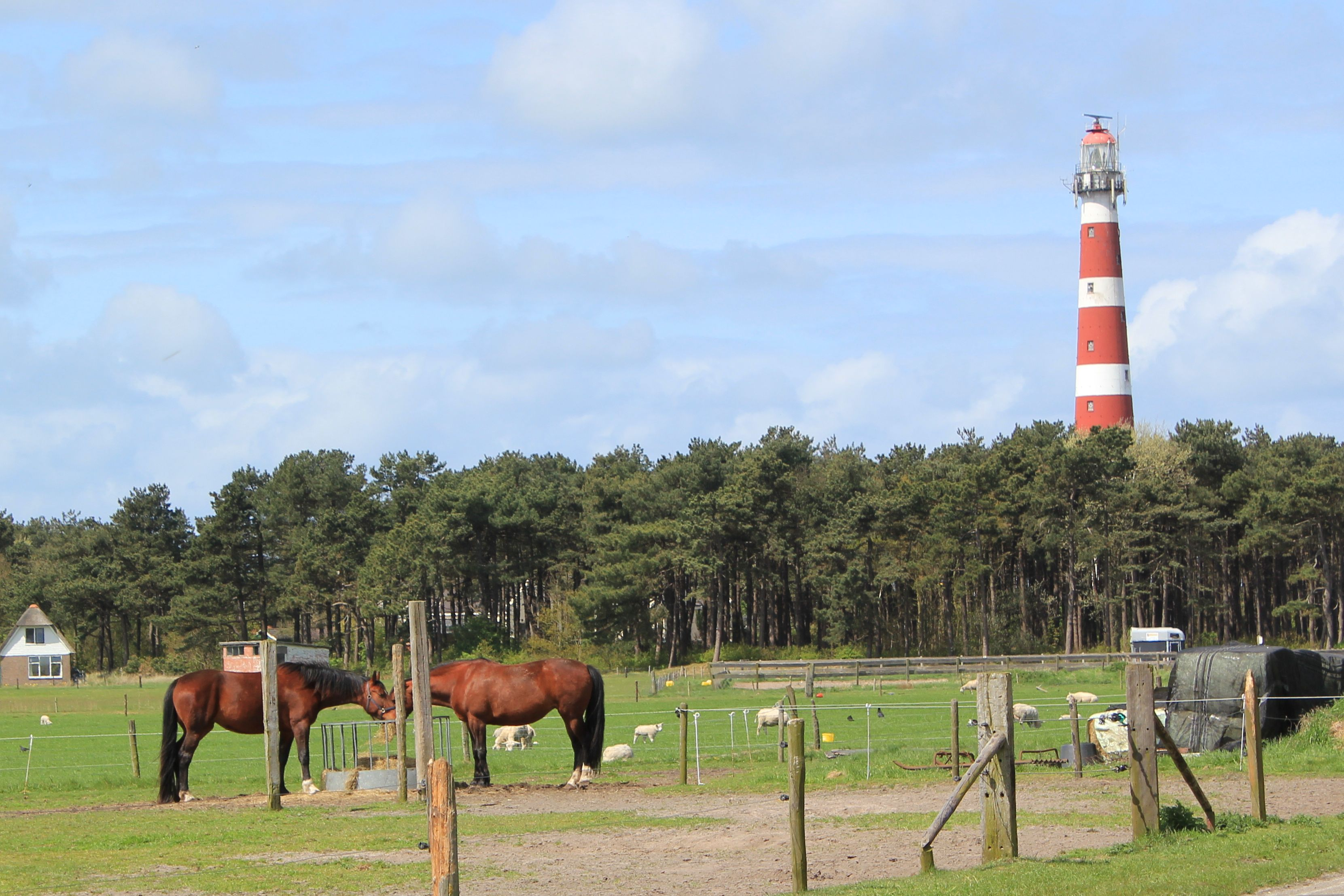
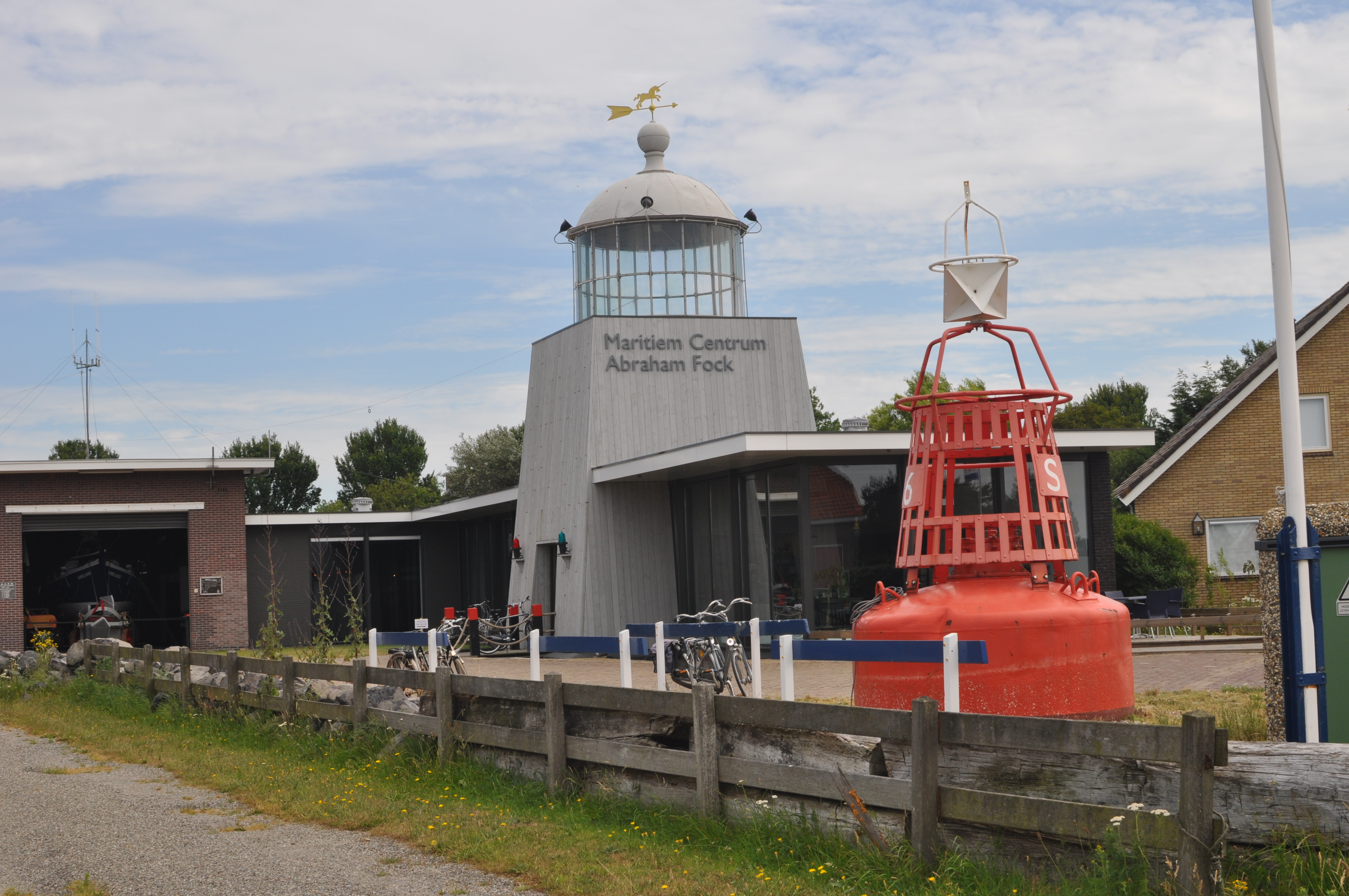
- Aerial view Ameland (west) Ameland Beach Museum Sorgdrager Lighthouse Maritime Museum

- Flag Coat of arms

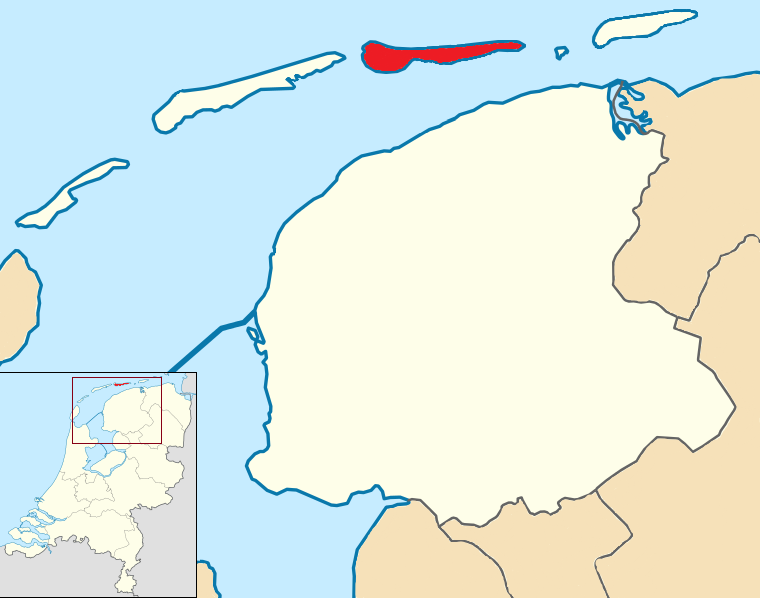
- Location in Friesland
- Coordinates: 53°27′N 5°46′E
- Country: Netherlands
- Province: Friesland

Government
  - Body: Municipal council
  - Mayor: Leo Pieter Stoel (VVD)

Area
  - Total: 268.50 km^{2} (103.67 sq mi)
  - Land: 59.11 km^{2} (22.82 sq mi)
  - Water: 209.39 km^{2} (80.85 sq mi)
- Elevation: 4 m (13 ft)

Population (2026)
  - Total: 3.816
  - Density: 63/km^{2} (160/sq mi)
- Demonym: Amelander
- Time zone: UTC+1 (CET)
  - Summer (DST): UTC+2 (CEST)
- Postcode: 9160–9164
- Area code: 0519
- Website: www.ameland.nl

Ramsar Wetland
- Official name: Duinen Ameland
- Designated: 29 August 2000
- Reference no.: 2212

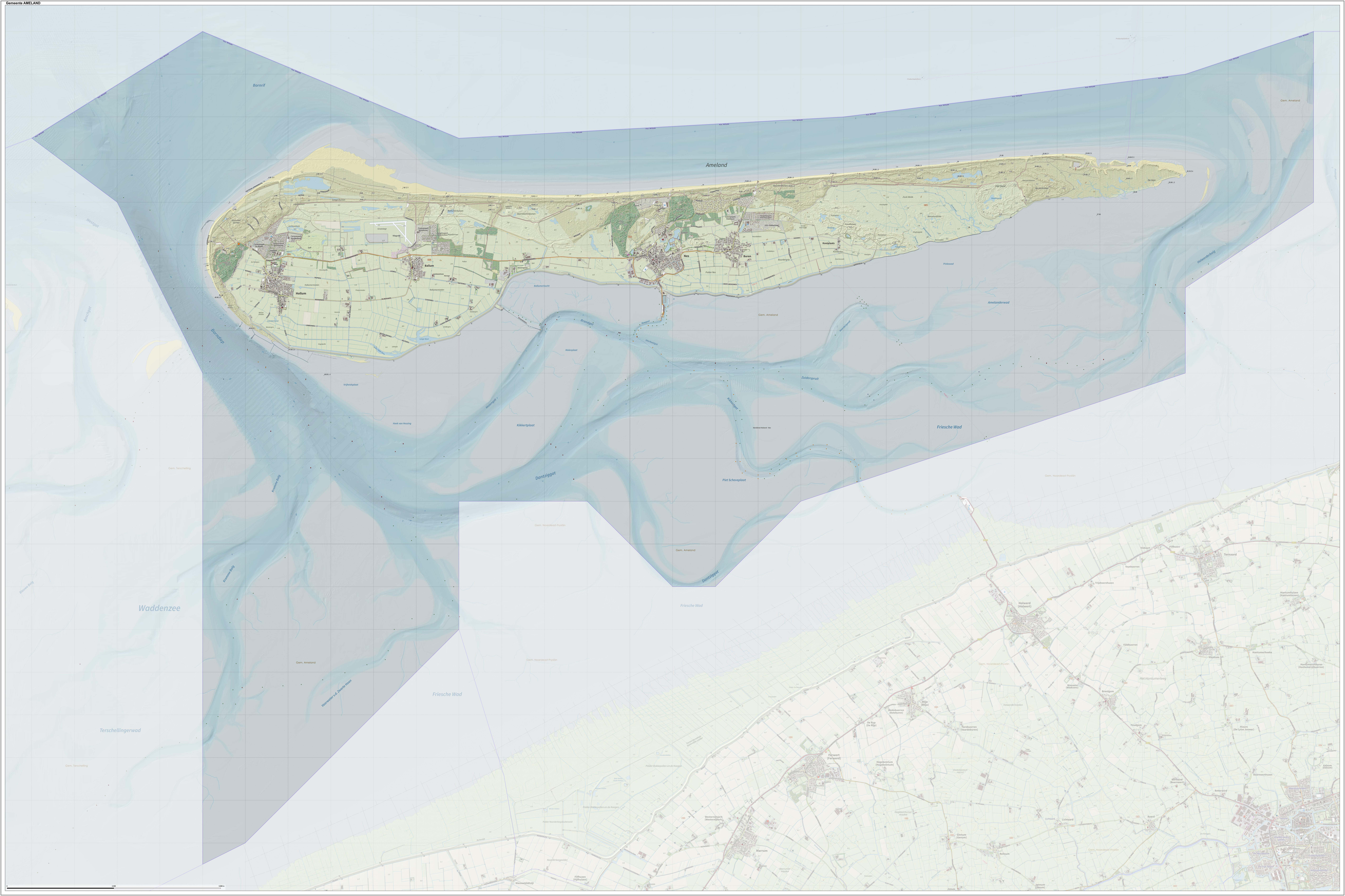
Topographic map of Ameland, February 2024

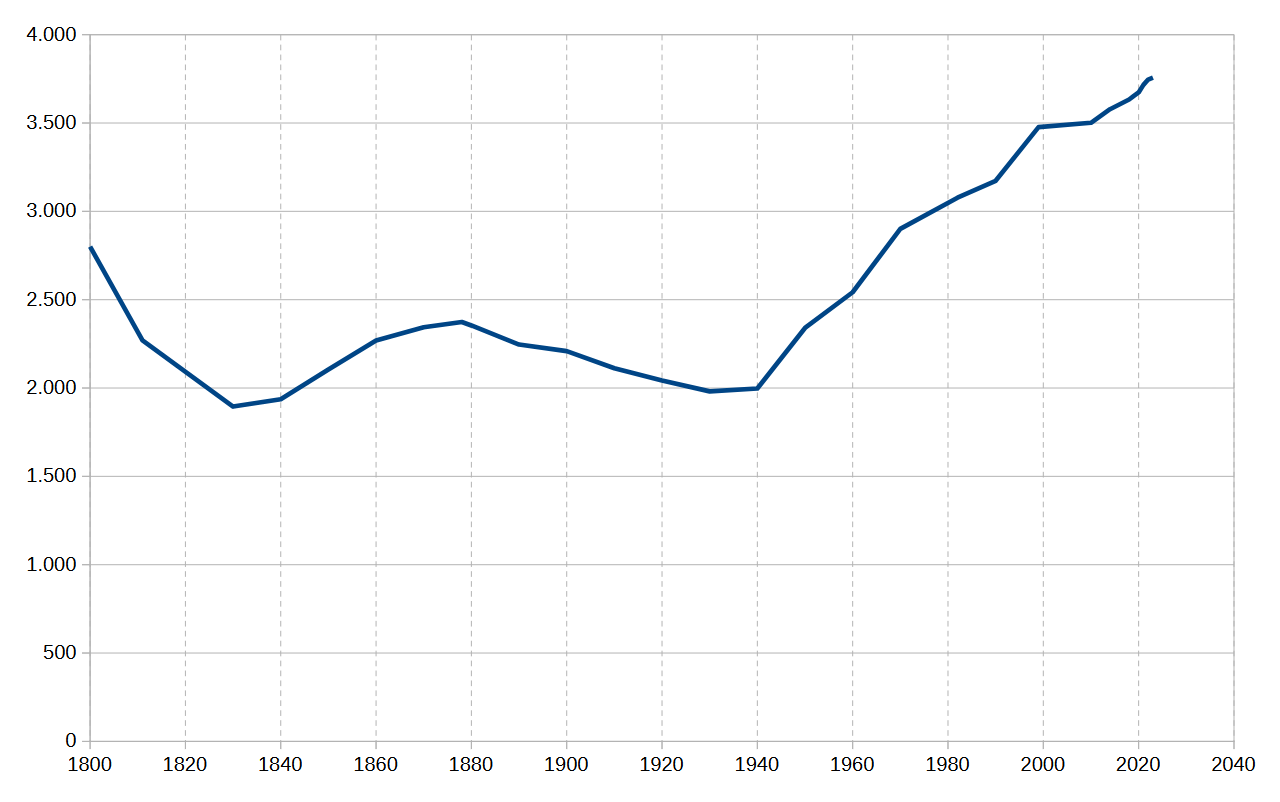
Historical population 1800–2023

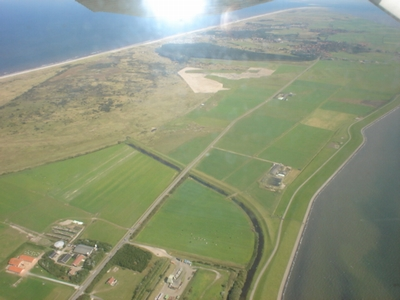
Aerial photograph of Ameland

Ameland (Dutch pronunciation: [ˈaːməlɑnt]; West Frisian: It Amelân [ət ˈaːməlɔ̃ːn]) is a municipality and one of the West Frisian Islands off the north coast of the Netherlands. It consists mostly of sand dunes and is the third major island of the West Frisians. It neighbours islands Terschelling to the west and Schiermonnikoog to the east. This includes the small Engelsmanplaat and Rif sandbanks to the east.

Ameland is, counted from the west, the fourth inhabited Dutch Wadden island and belongs to the Friesland (Fryslân) province. The whole island falls under one municipality, which carries the same name. The Wadden islands form the border between the North Sea and the Wadden Sea, which lies on the south side of the island file. The municipality of Ameland had a population of 3,746 in 2021. The inhabitants are called Amelanders.

== Places ==
The island has four villages. From west to east, these are:

- Hollum, the most populated village, located on the west coast, home to the island's lighthouse
- Ballum, smallest village, location of the island's airfield, Ameland Airport
- Nes, the second largest of the island, a vibrant tourist village with many hotels, also home to Burgemeester Waldaschool (the island's secondary school), and ferry services from Holwert on the mainland
- Buren, located at the centre of the island, includes Ameland's beach

There were two other villages: Sier and Oerd. Sier was buried by advancing sand dunes, with the last house being abandoned around 1730, and Oerd was flooded in the first half of the 18th century. The names of these villages live on in MS Oerd and MS Sier, which are the names of the ferries to the island.

== Population ==
The population of each village of the island as of 2017:

Name	Population
Hollum	1,165
Nes	1,155
Buren	715
Ballum	350

== History ==
First mentioned as Ambla in the 8th century, it paid tribute to the county of Holland until in 1424 its lord, Ritske Jelmera, declared it a "free lordship" (vrijheerschap): the Lordship of Ameland.

Although Holland, Friesland and the Holy Roman Emperor contested this quasi-independent status, it remained a free lordship until the ruling family, Cammingha, died out in 1708. After that, the Frisian stadtholder John William Friso, Prince of Orange, became lord of Ameland and after him, his son the stadtholder of all the Netherlands, William IV, Prince of Orange, and his grandson, William V, Prince of Orange.

Only in the constitution of 1813 was the island finally integrated into the Netherlands into the province of Friesland. The monarchy of the Netherlands still maintain the title Vrijheer van Ameland today.

In 1871–72, a dike was built between Ameland and the mainland by a society for the reclamation of Frisian land from the sea. The dike ran from Holwert to Buren and was 8.7 km (5 mi) long. The province and the Dutch realm each paid 200,000 guilders. In the end, it was unsuccessful; the dike did not prove to be durable and in 1882, after heavy storms in the winter, repairs and maintenance of the dam were stopped. The dike can still be partially seen at low tide. The dam at Holwert is the beginning of this dike.

In 1940, German troops were ferried to the island and within hours Ameland was under the control of the German Army. Due to its limited military value, the Allies never invaded Ameland. The German forces on the island did not surrender until 2 June 1945, almost a full month after the defeat of Nazi Germany.

=== 2023 MV Fremantle Highway fire ===
In July 2023, a fire on the Panamanian flagged cargo ship MV Fremantle Highway carrying over 3,700 cars off the coast of Ameland left one sailor dead and 22 others injured.

== Nature ==
Like all West and East Frisian Islands, Ameland is a unique piece of nature. The profusion of different plants on the island is caused by the immense variety of landscapes. One of the scenic areas is the Oerd, a large complex of dunes which is still expanding by the year. Because of the differing landscapes and types of flora, over 60 different species of birds are sitting there every year. At the eastern part of the Oerd lies a beach plain called the Hon. Besides dunes and beaches, Ameland has some woods, like the Nesser bos ("Wood of Nes").

== Transport ==
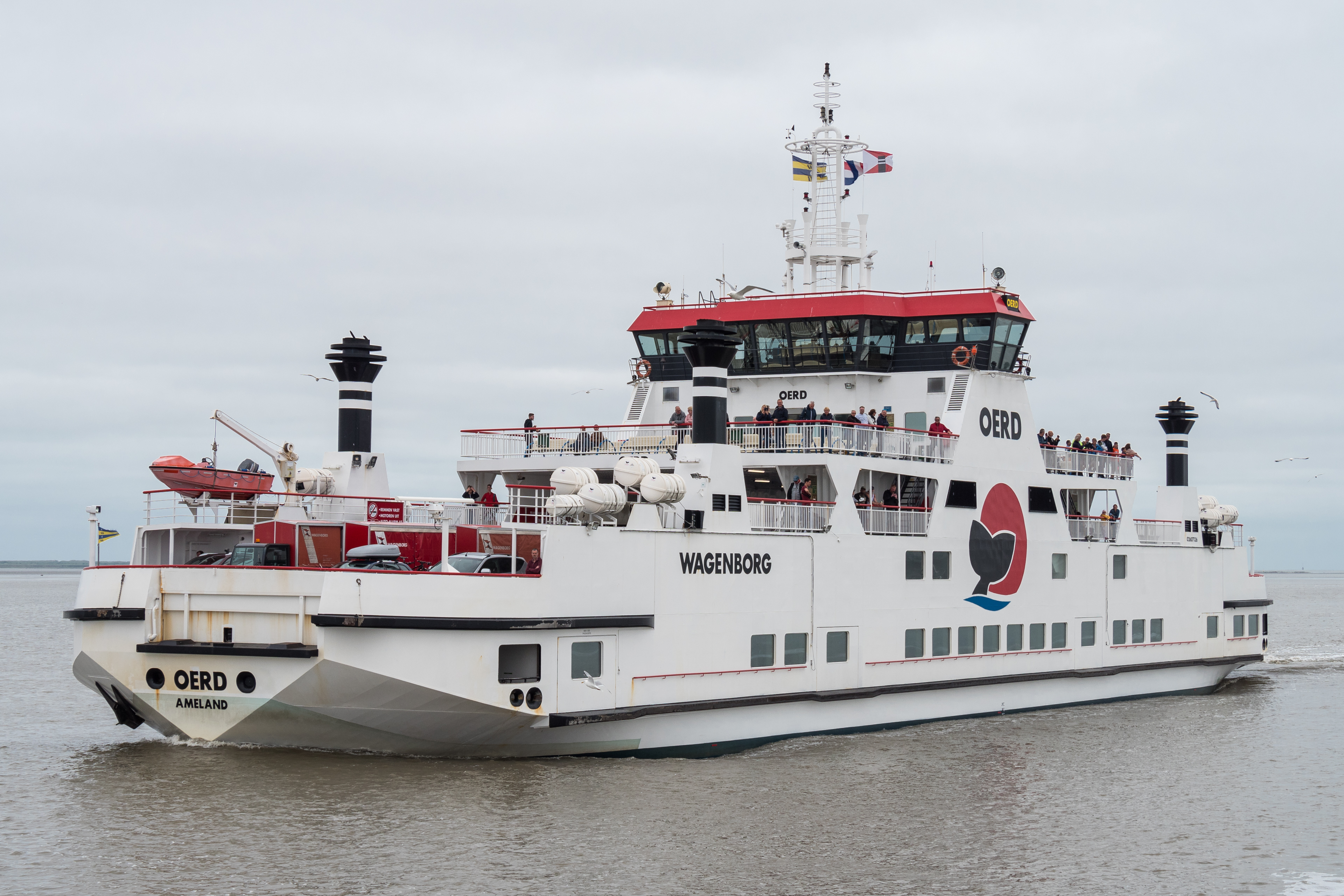
Ferry "Oerd"

Most travelers reach the island by ferry from Holwert on the mainland of Friesland, but there is also an airport near Ballum (Ameland Airport). A bus service connects the ferries from Hollum/Ballum (route 130) and Buren/Nes (route 132). When the sea between Friesland and Ameland is at low tide, one can walk across (see mudflat hiking).

== Notable people ==
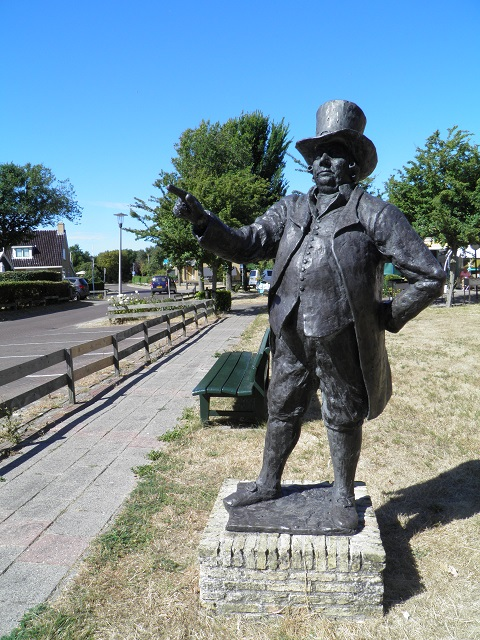
Statue of Hidde Dirks Kat

The following people were born on Ameland:

- Ritske Jelmera (1383 in Ternaard – 1450) a Frisian chieftain who ruled the island of Ameland
- Hidde Dirks Kat, whaler
- Johannes de Jong (1885 in Nes – 1955), Archbishop of Utrecht 1936/1955
- Hannes de Boer (1899 in Hollum – 1982), long jumper, participated in the 1924 and 1928 Olympic Games
- Sjoerd Soeters (born 1947 in Nes), postmodern architect
- Pieter Mosterman (born 1967 in Nes), a research Scientist and academic in the USA
- Jan Bruin (born 1969 in Hollum), retired Dutch soccer player.

== Gallery ==
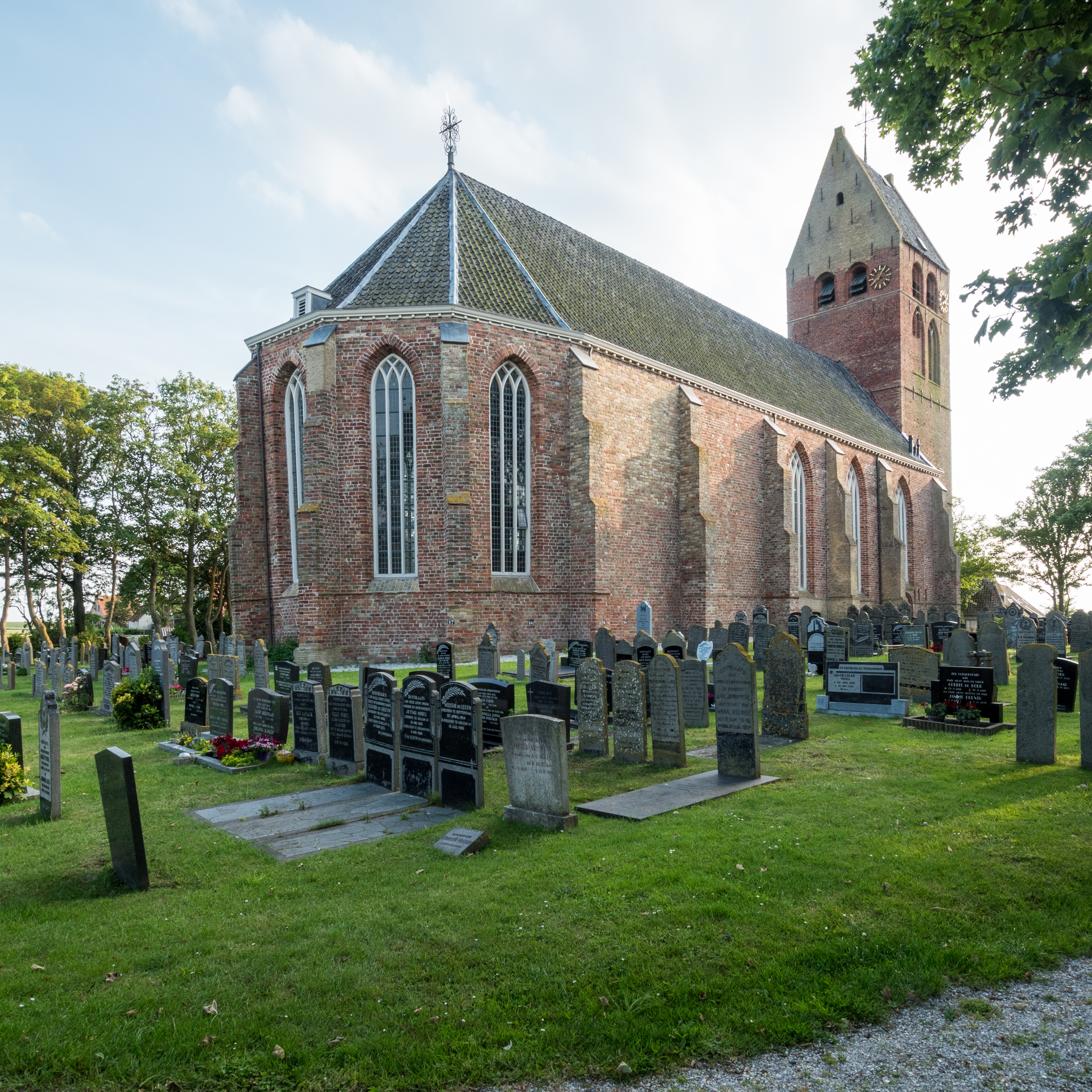
Hervormde Kerk in Hollum

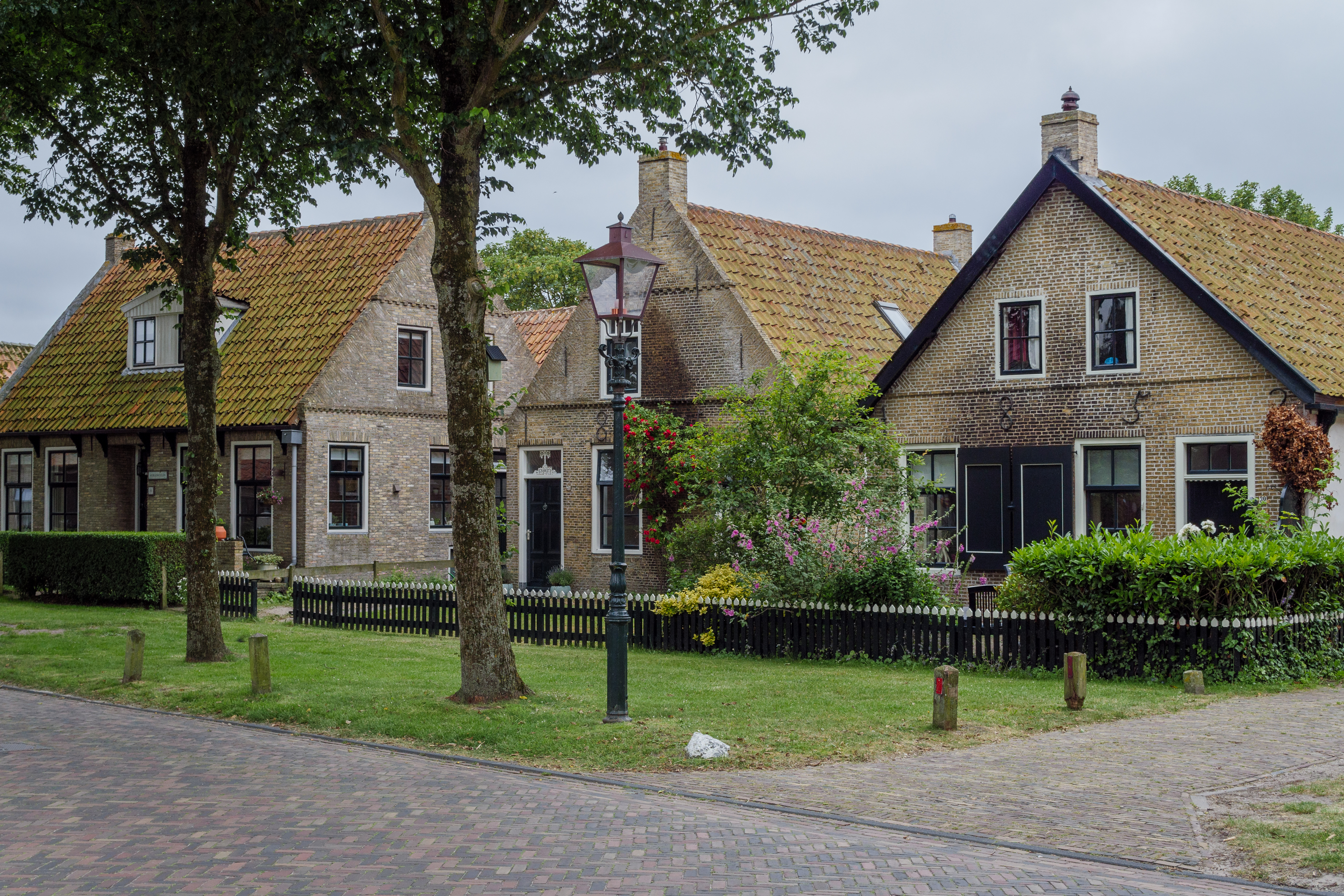
Camminghastraat in Ballum

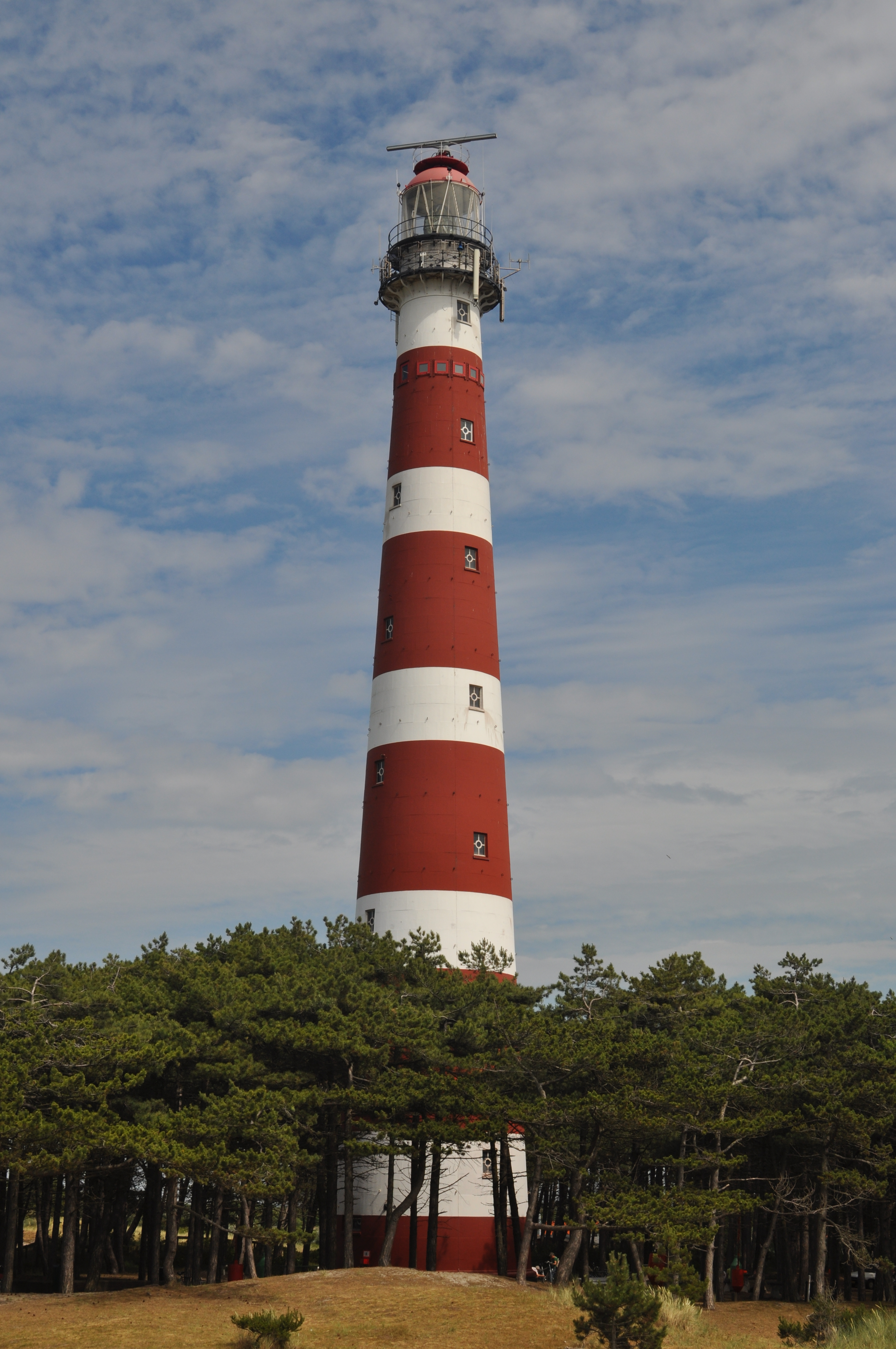
Bornrif lighthouse

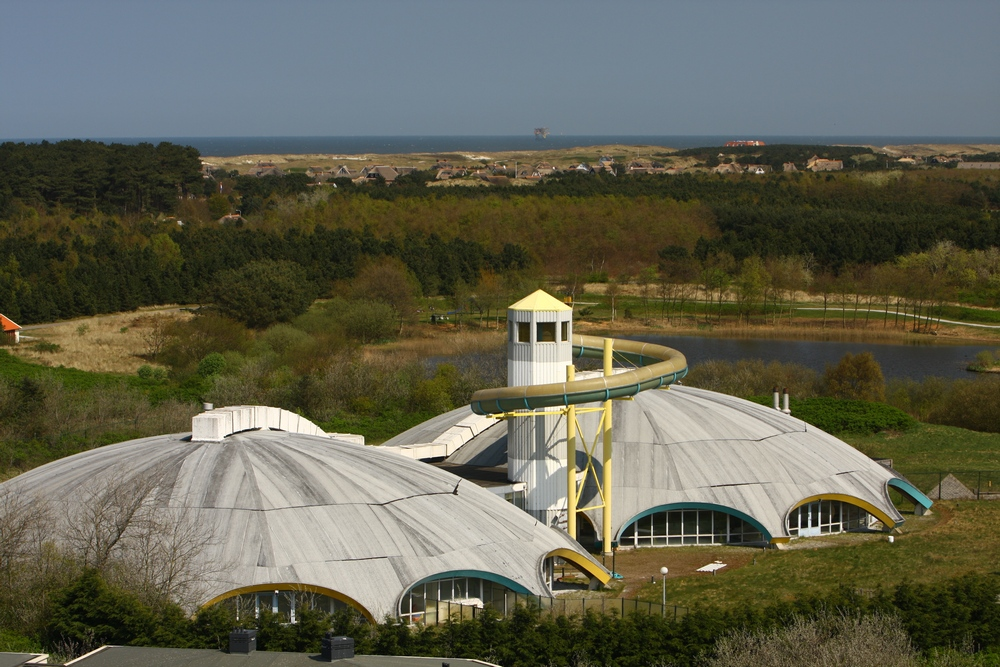
Abandoned swimmingpool at Ameland

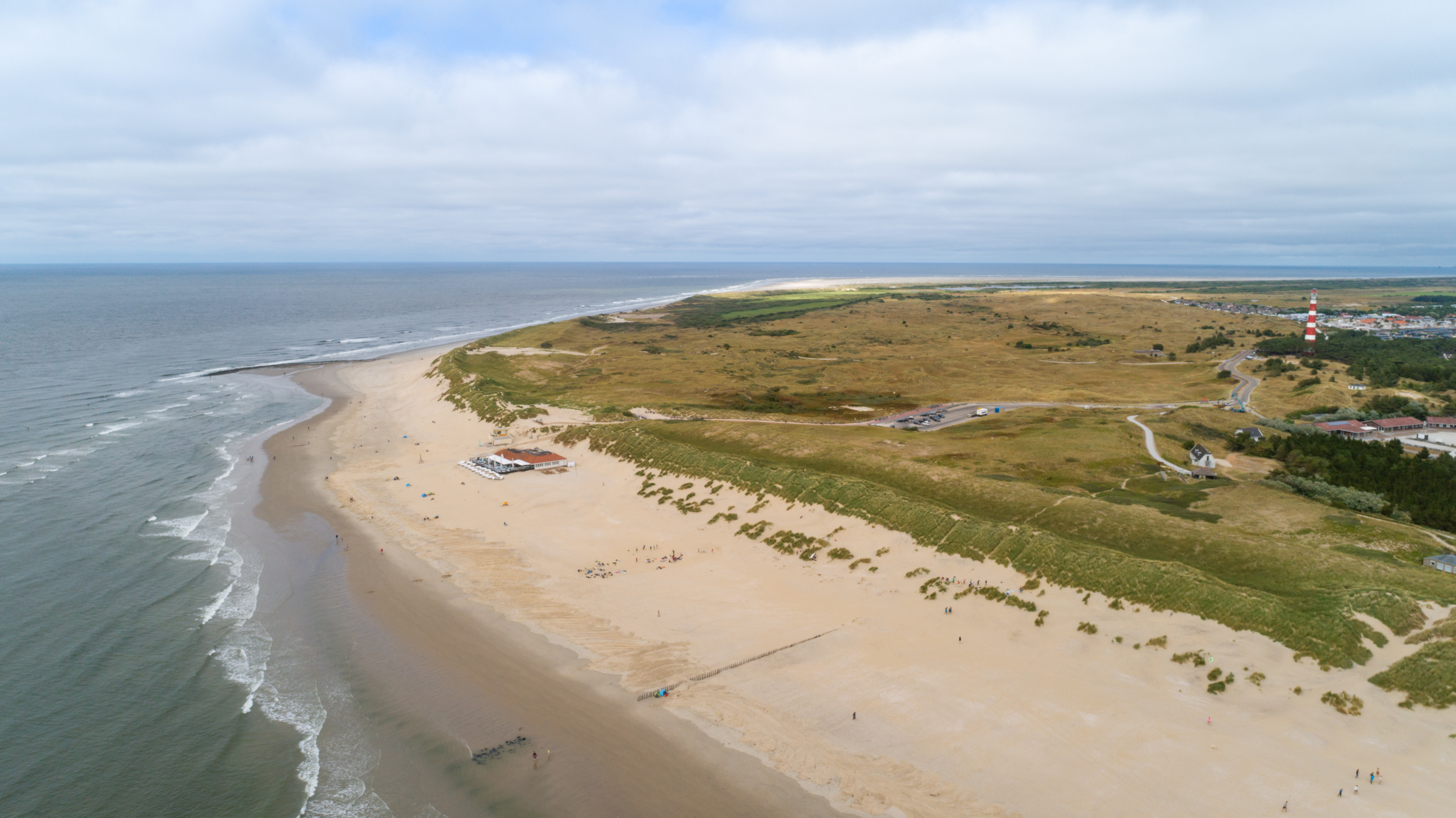
Ameland, Hollum beach dunes
