= Ameland Airport =

Ameland Airport Ballum Vliegveld Ameland
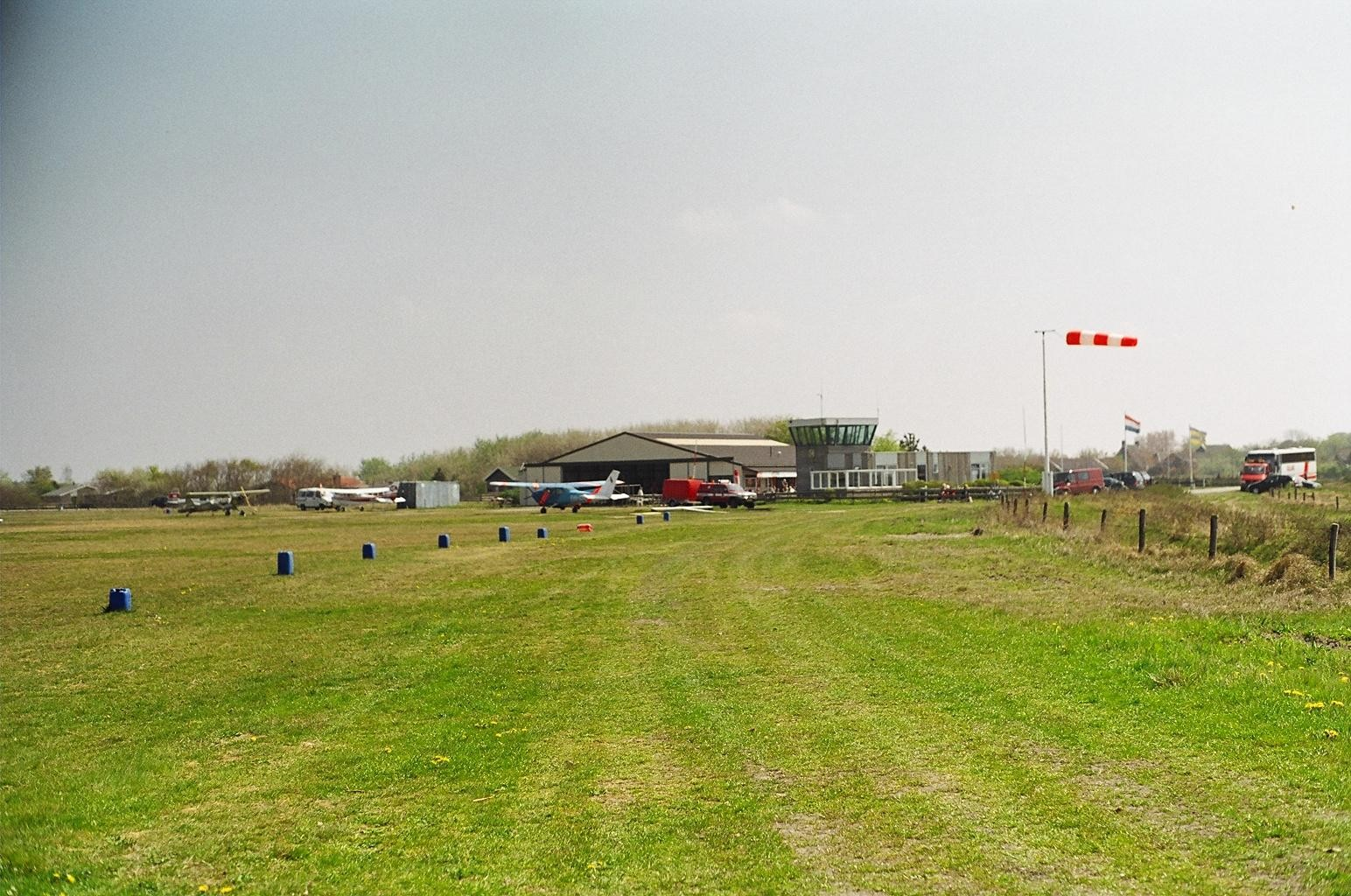
- IATA: none; ICAO: EHAL

Summary
- Airport type: Public
- Owner/Operator: Municipality of Ameland
- Serves: Ameland
- Location: Ballum
- Elevation AMSL: 11 ft / 4 m
- Coordinates: 53°27′06″N 005°40′38″E
- Website: www.ehal.nl
- Interactive map of Ameland Airport Ballum

Runways
| Direction | Length | | Surface |
| Direction | m | ft | Surface |
|---|---|---|---|
| 08/26 | 800 | 2,624 | Grass |

Statistics
- Aircraft movements: 5,500/year
- Source: AIP from AIS the Netherlands

Ameland Airport (Dutch: Vliegveld Ameland) (ICAO: EHAL), also known as Ameland Airport Ballum, is a small general aviation airport located near the town of Ballum on the western part of the island of Ameland, one of the West Frisian Islands in the Netherlands. It is located in the province of Friesland and is the northernmost airport in the country.

The airport has a single short grass runway and a helipad, the latter being mainly used for search and rescue (SAR) flights. Customs services are not available, so no international flights are allowed except for those from other Schengen countries. The airport is used mainly for recreational purposes, so it is not open in winter (October 1 through the last day of March) unless prior arrangements are made.

About 5,500 airplane movements (takeoff or landing) are made at the airport a year. OFD Ostfriesischer-Flug-Dienst offers an on-demand service to Borkum and Emden.
