= Ballum =

- Village
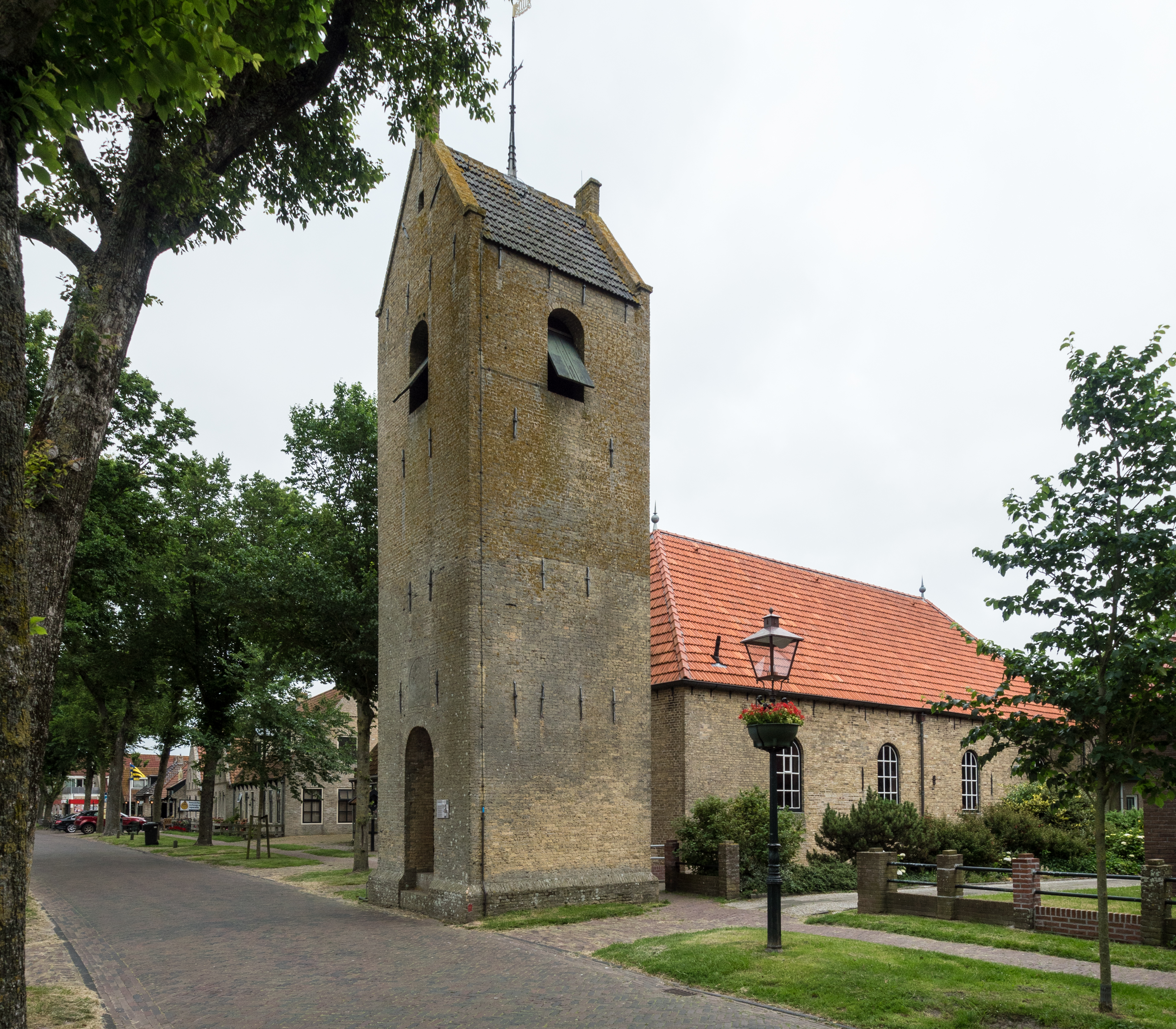
- Ballum Church

- Flag

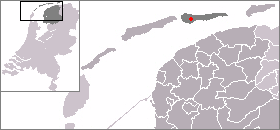
- Location in Ameland municipality

- Location in the province of Friesland Ballum (Netherlands)
- Country: Netherlands
- Province: Friesland
- Municipality: Ameland

Area
  - Total: 17.19 km^{2} (6.64 sq mi)
- Elevation: 2.3 m (7.5 ft)

Population (2021)
  - Total: 480
  - Density: 28/km^{2} (72/sq mi)
- Time zone: UTC+1 (CET)
  - Summer (DST): UTC+2 (CEST)
- Postal code: 9162
- Dialing code: 0519

Ballum (Dutch pronunciation: [ˈbɑlʏm]) is a village on the western half of the island of Ameland and the smallest of the total of four villages on the island, one of the West Frisian Islands and part of the Netherlands.

== History ==
The village was first mentioned in 1473 as "jn balnera lees: balmera buren", and means "settlement of Balle (person)". Ballum is an esdorp with a triangular village square which developed in the Late Middle Ages.

In the early 15th century, the castle Jelmera State was built in Ballum which later became known as Camminghaslot after the Cammingha family became owners of the island. The castle started to deteriorate and transporting stones to the island was too expensive, therefore, the island was sold to John William Friso, the Prince of Orange. Willem-Alexander of the Netherlands, the current King, still uses the title "Vrijheer of Ameland" as one of his titles. In 1795, the island was confiscated, and the castle became the residence of the grietman of Ameland. In 1829, the castle was condemned and demolished. The municipal hall of Ameland was built in its place. In 1961, a new municipal hall was built.

The bell tower was built in 1755 as a replacement of the wooden tower. It was enlarged in 1870. The Dutch Reformed church is an aisleless church which was built in 1832 to replace the medieval church which was located at a distance.

Ballum was home to 289 people in 1840.

The small Ameland Airport is located northwest of Ballum.

== People from Ballum ==
- Eelke Bakker, oldest living man in the Benelux. Died 2020, aged 109.

== Gallery ==
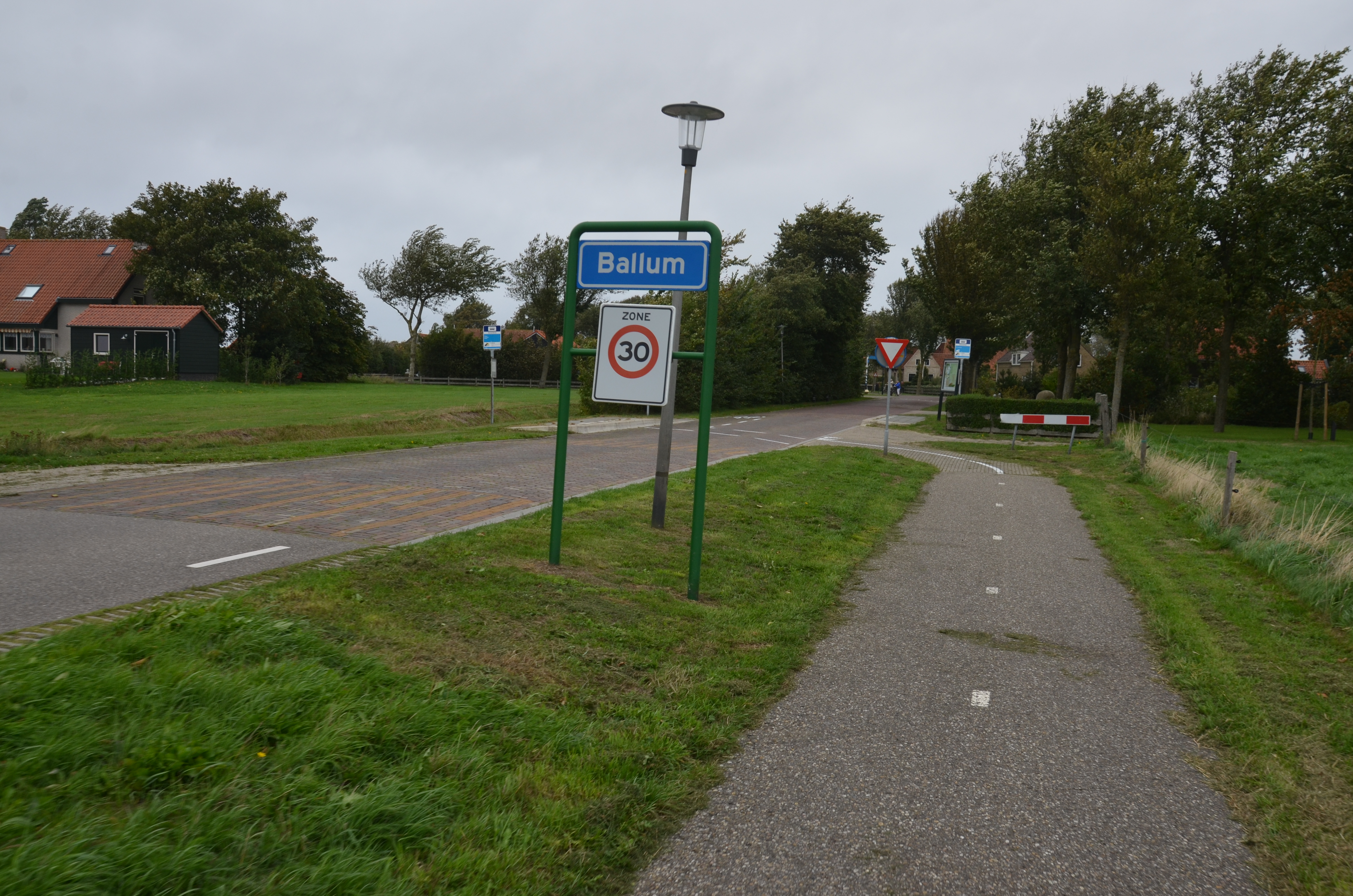
Welcome to Ballum

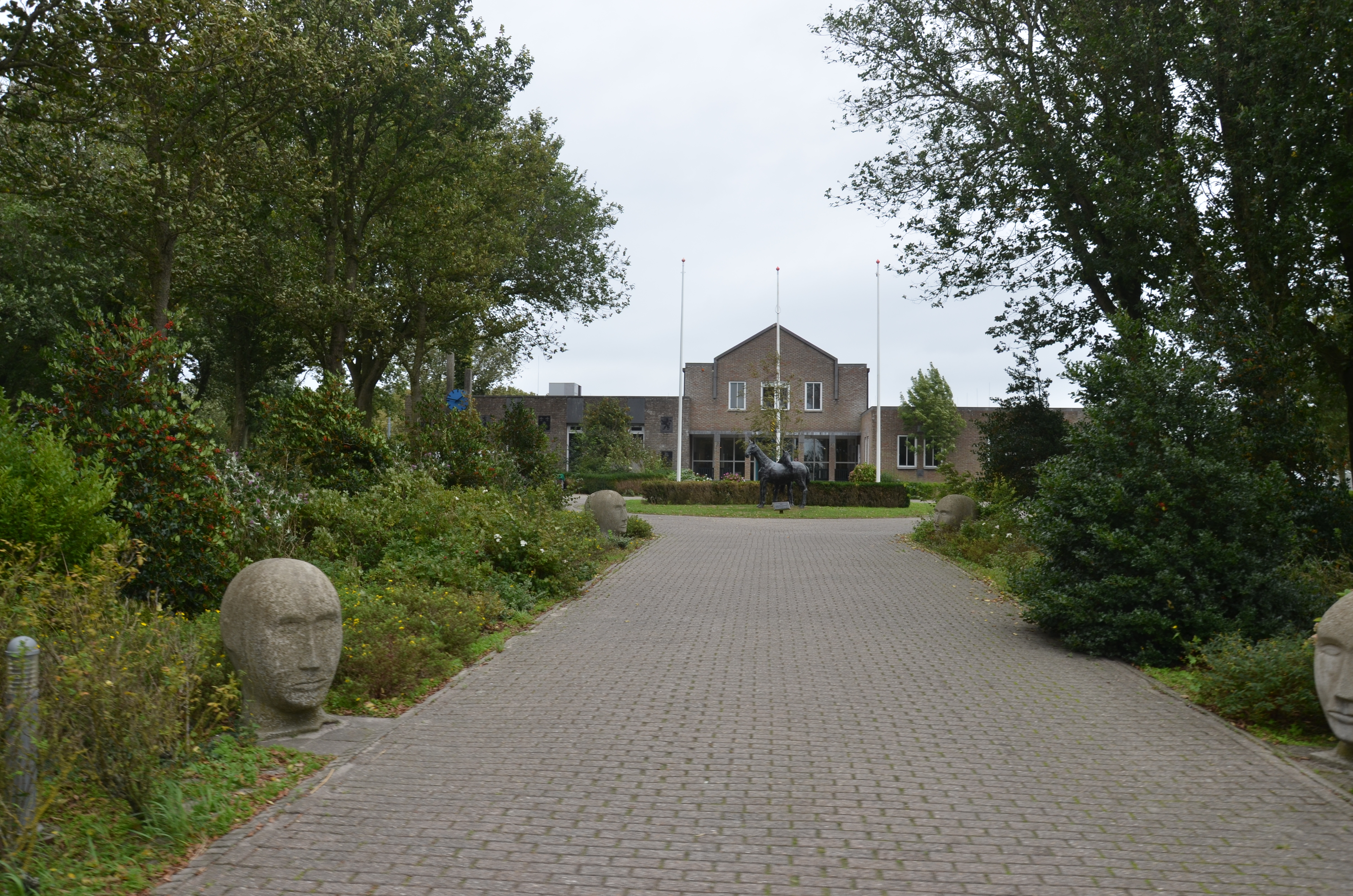
Municipal hall

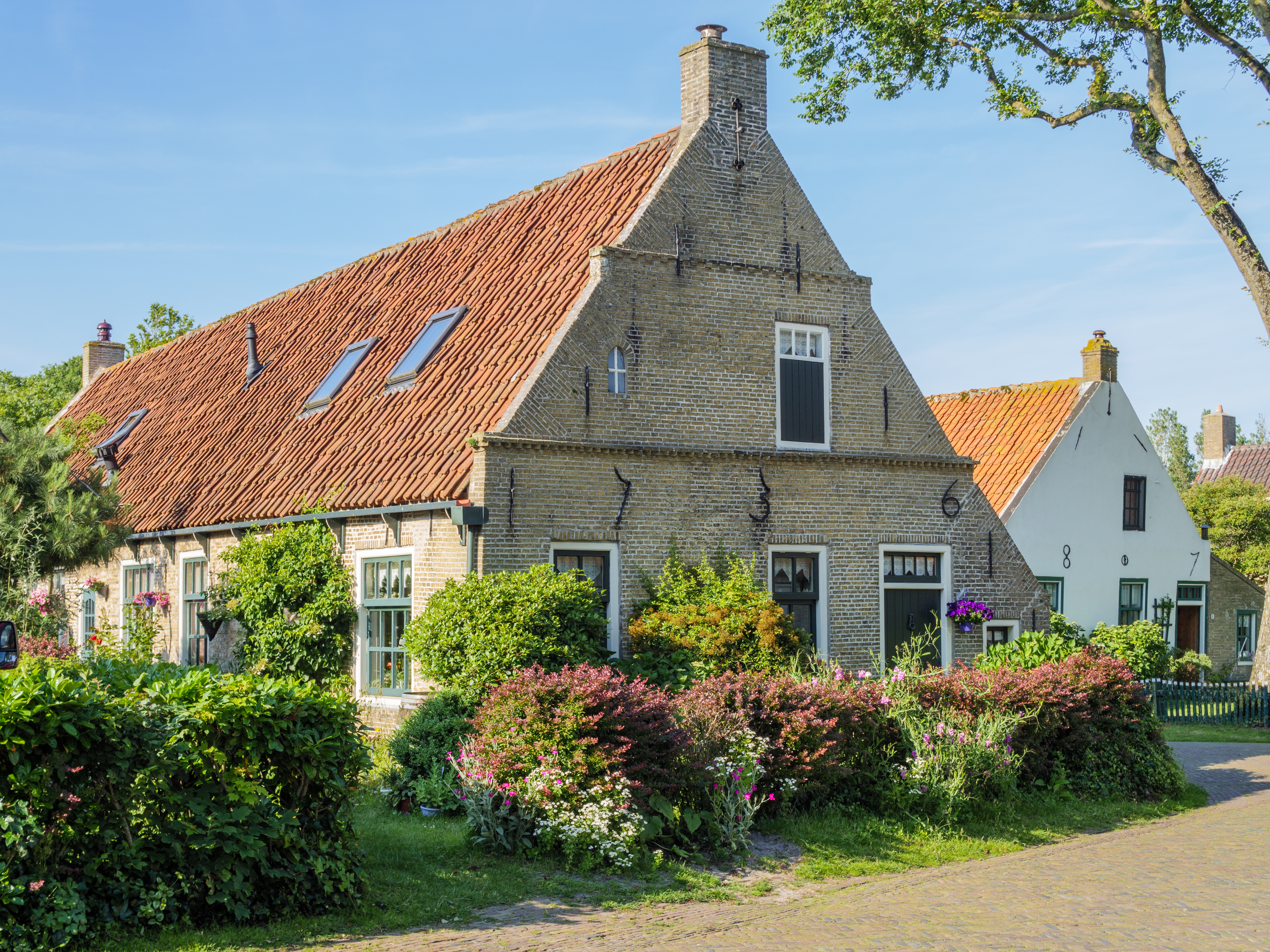
House in Ballum
