= Cammingha =

Frisian noble family

- noble family
- Country: Netherlands
- Founded: 16th century
- Founder: Rienck Cammingha

Van Cammingha is an old Frisian noble family and their house from the Dutch province of Friesland. Currently the town hall of Ballum is located on the Island of Ameland, on the location where the family castle stood until 1828.

== History ==
The oldest known ancestor is Rienck Cammingha who lived in the first part of the 16th century. Different scions of the family lives on the family estate Wiarda in Goutum near the city of Leeuwarden. The family have played an important role in the Dutch history since the early 17th century. Since 1814 the family belongs to the Dutch nobility with the title of Jonkheer.

== Literature ==
- Bultsma, P., G.A. Brongers, and A.B. Dull tot Backenhagen. Noord-Nederlandse Heraldiek, Familiewapens Drenthe-Friesland-Groningen. Hoogezand: Uitgeverij Stubeg, 1987.
- Genealogie Kwartaalblad CBG 2002-01 Y. Kuiper en J. Frieswijk (red.). Twee eeuwen Friese adel 1814–2000. Van landadel naar his- torisch instituut. Heerenveen: Uitgeverij Van Mazijk, 2000. 183 blz., ill. (TPFr-SGKuip). ISBN 90-72572-38-6.
- Nederland's Adelsboek 81 (1990–1991), pp. 41–48.

== See also ==
- Wijtgaard

== Trivia ==
- The coat of arms of the family is the emblem of the football club Cambuur, SC Cambuur.
- The coat of arms is an example of canting arms, since in Dutch "kam" means comb.
