= List of islands of the Netherlands =

The Netherlands

This is a list of islands of the Kingdom of the Netherlands.

== West Frisian Islands (in the Wadden Sea) ==
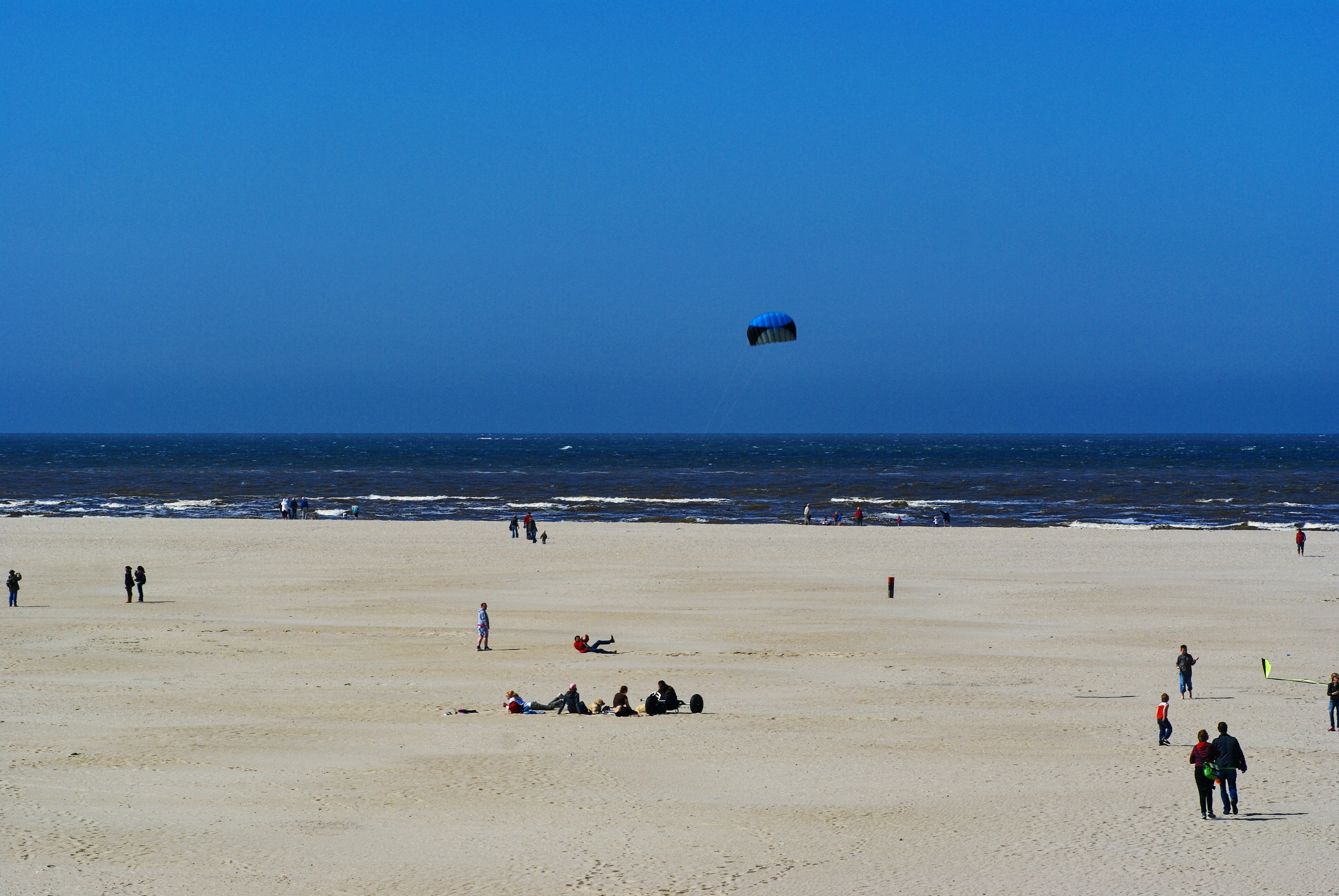
Beach of Texel

- Noorderhaaks
- Texel
- Vlieland
- Richel
- Terschelling
- Griend
- Ameland
- Rif
- Engelsmanplaat
- Schiermonnikoog
- Simonszand
- Rottumerplaat
- Rottumeroog
- Zuiderduintjes

== Islands and former islands In South Holland ==
- Dordrecht Island
- Goeree-Overflakkee
- Hoeksche Waard
- IJsselmonde
- Kaag and some uninhabited islands in the Kagerplassen
- Rozenburg
- Tiengemeten
- Voorne-Putten

== Islands and former islands in Zeeland ==
Some of the following islands have become peninsulas. Others are still considered to be islands although they are connected to the mainland with bridges.

- Neeltje-Jans, artificial island
- Noord-Beveland
- Roggenplaat
- Schouwen-Duiveland
- Sint Philipsland
- Tholen
- Walcheren
- Zuid-Beveland

== Islands in the IJsselmeer, Markermeer, or former Zuiderzee ==
- Flevopolder, the world's largest artificial island
- IJsseloog
- Marken
- Pampus
- Vuurtoreneiland
- Wieringen, Schokland and Urk are former islands, now part of a polder
- De Kreupel, an artificial island, constructed to be a bird refuge
- The Marker Wadden archipelago, a collection of artificial islands in the Markermeer

== Islands in the Caribbean ==
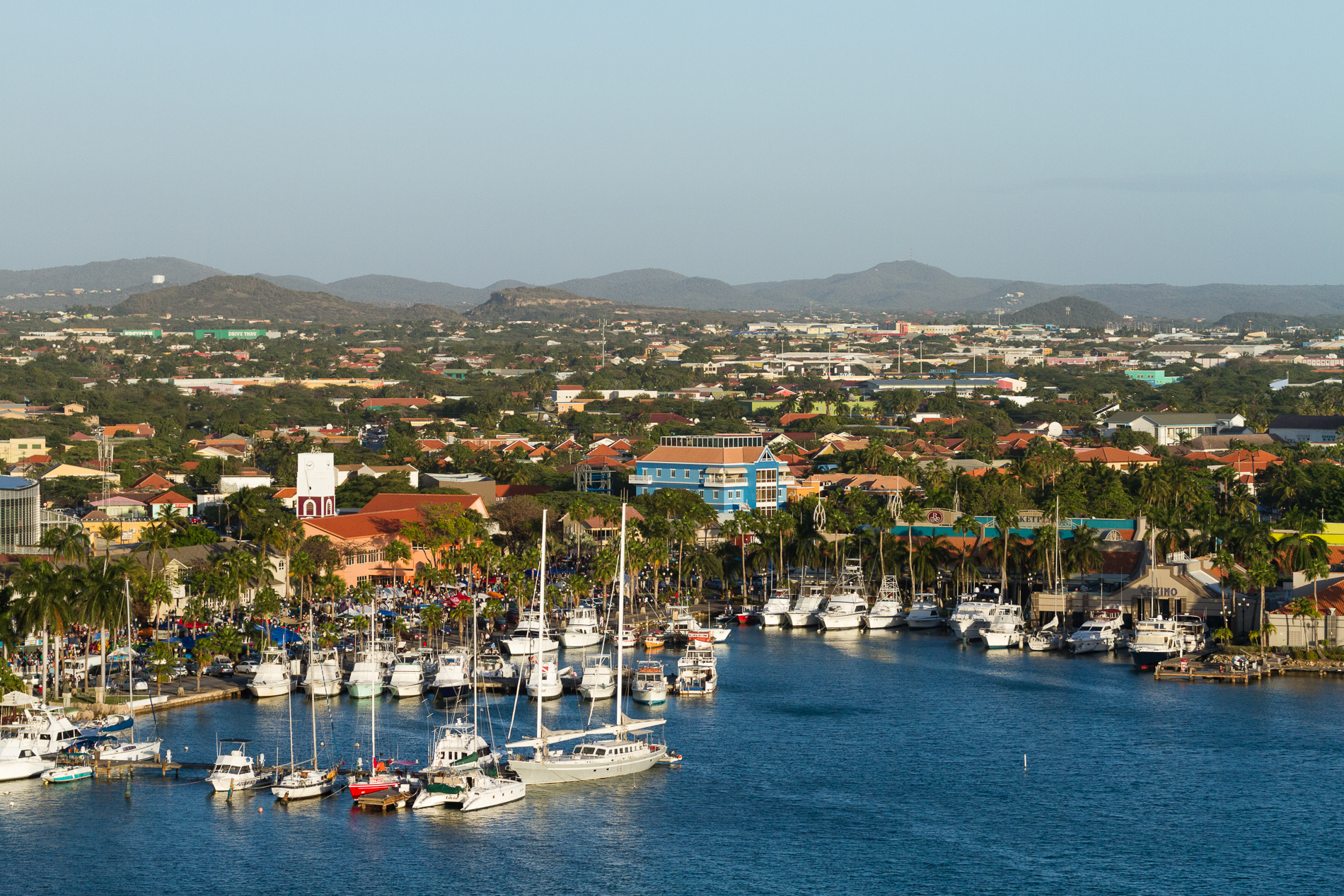
Aruba

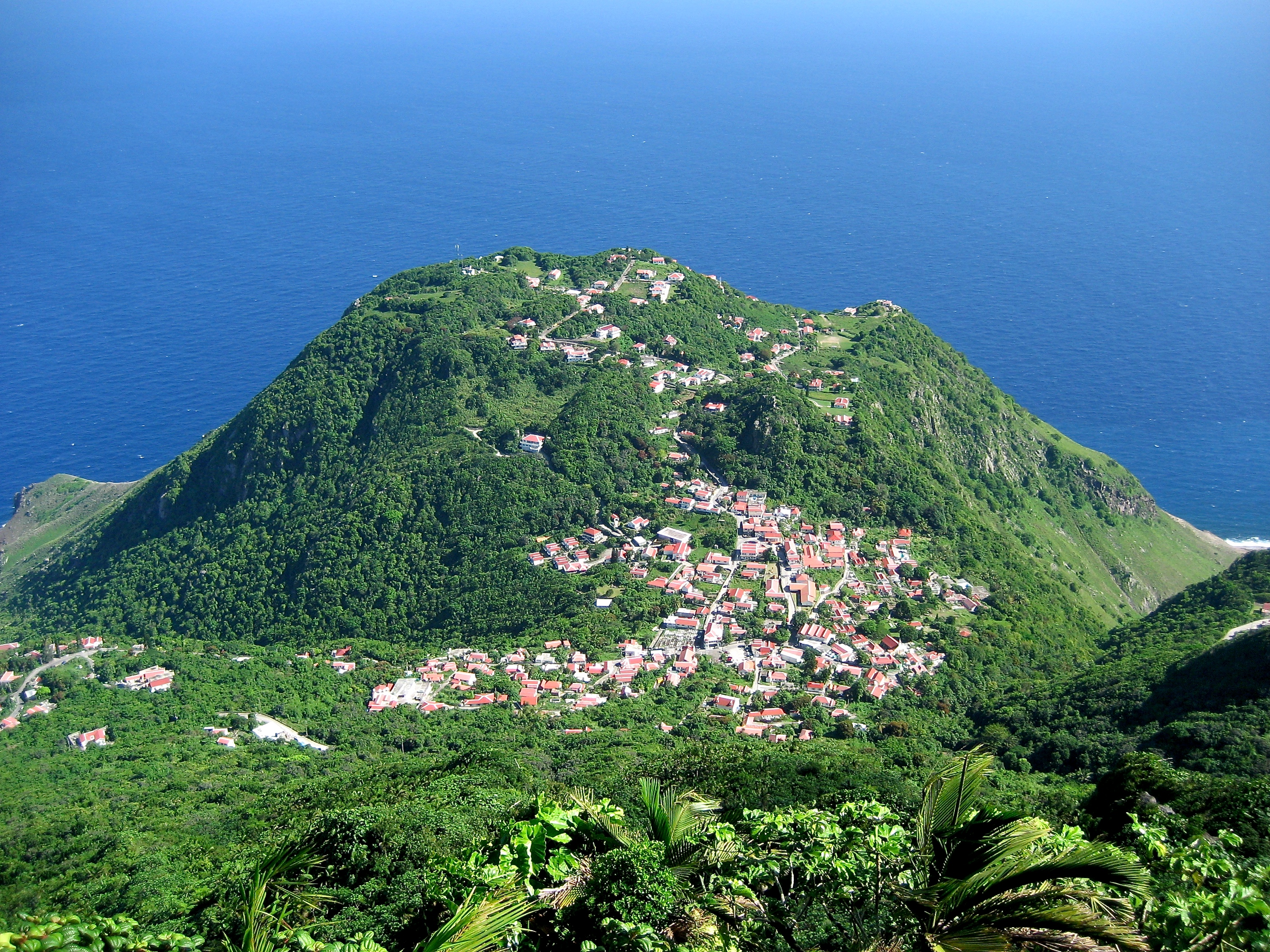
Saba

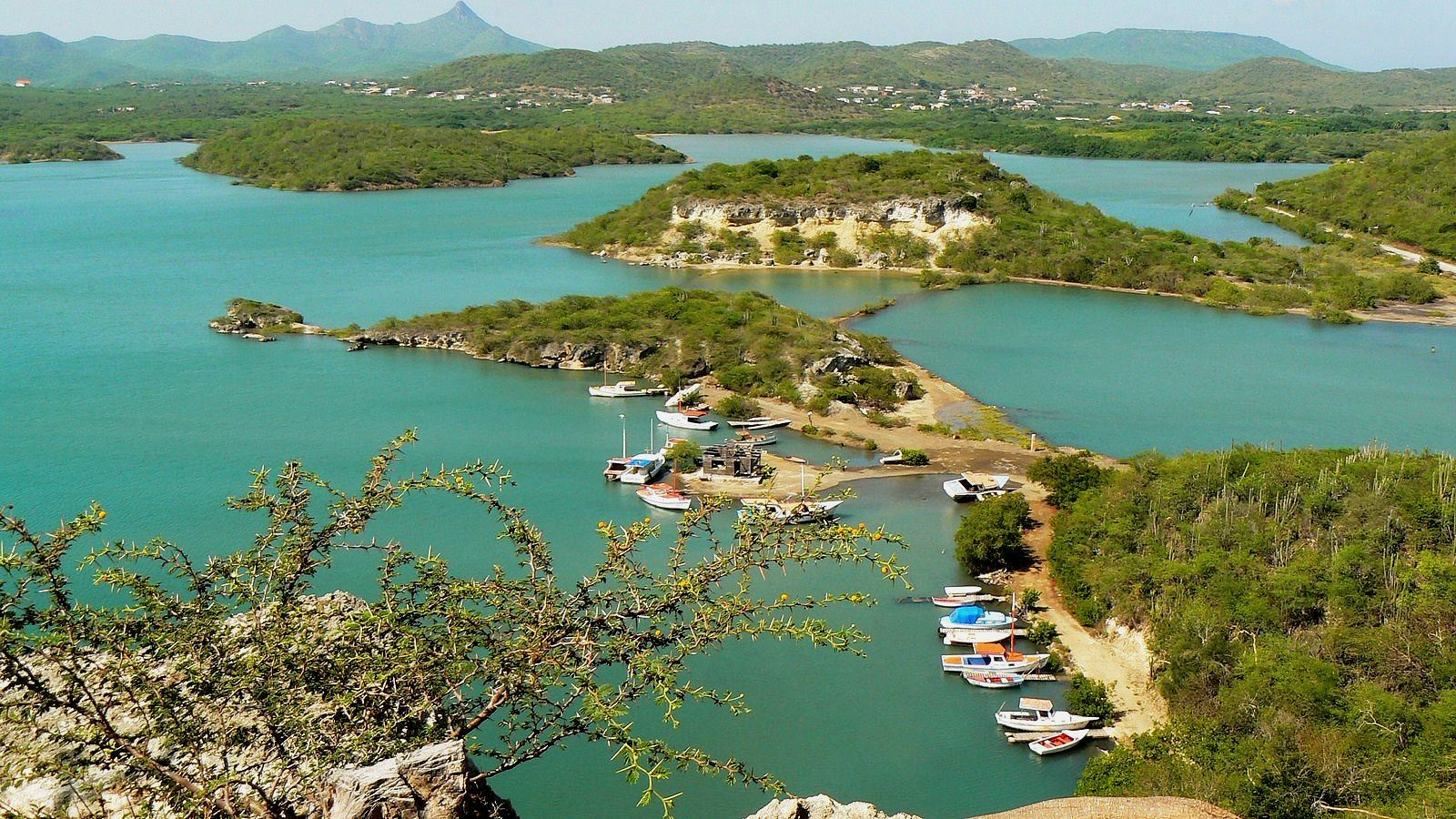
Curaçao

- Aruba
- Bonaire
- Camia
- Curaçao
- Green Island
- Guana Cay
- Hen and Chicken
- Indiaanskop
- Isla Makuka
- Kadoesji
- Key Cay
- Klein Bonaire
- Klein Curaçao
- Little Island
- Little Key
- Long Cay
- Mal Aborder
- Meeuwtje
- Mollibeday Rots
- Mona Island
- Pelican Island
- Penso
- Rancho
- Ronde Island
- Saba
- Sint Eustatius
- Sapaté Eiland
- Sint Maarten (section of island also shared with France)
- Willemberg

== See also ==
- List of islands in the Caribbean
- List of islands
