= List of shipwrecks in the 1750s =

The List of shipwrecks in the 1750s includes some ships sunk, wrecked or otherwise lost during the 1750s.

== 1754 ==
=== May ===
Unknown date

List of shipwrecks: Unknown date May 1750
Ship	State	Description
Queen Caroline	(Kingdom of Great Britain) British America	The schooner was wrecked at Ockracock, North Carolina. Her crew were rescued.

=== October ===
14 October

List of shipwrecks: 14 October 1750
Ship	State	Description
Charming Polly	(Kingdom of Great Britain) British America	The ship, which had sprung a leak six days previously, was beached north of the Currituck Inlet, North Carolina. She was on a voyage from Newfoundland to Philadelphia, Pennsylvania.

=== December ===
Unknown date

List of shipwrecks: Unknown date December 1750
Ship	State	Description
Granville	Great Britain	The ship was driven ashore in the Isles of Scilly. She was on a voyage from Boston, Massachusetts, British America, to London.

=== Unknown date ===
List of shipwrecks: Unknown date 1750
Ship	State	Description
Brittania	(Kingdom of Great Britain) British America	The fishing schooner left Gloucester, Massachusetts, September 1753, last heard from December, 1754 lost on the Georges Bank. Lost with all hands.
Christian & Peter	Dutch Republic	The ship foundered whilst on a voyage from Surinam to Amsterdam.
Yelizaveta (Елизавета)	Imperial Russian Navy	The ship was wrecked on the coast of the Kamchatka Peninsula.
Honourable Friend	Great Britain	The ship was lost on the coast of Guinea.
Marischall Keith	Russia	The ship was struck by lightning and destroyed by fire in the Adriatic Sea off Cape Stillo, Ottoman Albania. She was on a voyage from Riga to Venice.
Prince George	Great Britain	The ship was driven ashore in the Gulf of Venice.
Ryder	(Kingdom of Great Britain) British America	The ship was lost before 25 July with some loss of life. She was on a voyage from the Piscataqua River to North Carolina.
Sarah	(Kingdom of Great Britain) British America	The ship foundered before 30 May whilst on a voyage from Rhode Island to the Piscataqua River. Her crew were rescued.

== 1756 ==
=== January ===
22 February

List of shipwrecks: 22 February 1756
Ship	State	Description
Unidentified boats		A landslide into the Langfjorden in Norway generated three megatsunamis with heights of 40 to 50 metres (131 to 164 ft) in the Langfjorden and the Eresfjorden that destroyed 196 boats.

=== March ===
28 March

List of shipwrecks: 28 March 1756
Ship	State	Description
Stad Bergen	Dutch Republic	While on voyage to Norway with a cargo of Frisian roof tiles and bricks she wrecked near the Dutch island Griend on the east wall of the Vliestroom.

=== October ===
31 October

List of shipwrecks: 31 October 1756
Ship	State	Description
HMS Swift	Royal Navy	The Drake-class sloop foundered at sea.

=== November ===
Unknown date

List of shipwrecks: Unknown date November 1756
Ship	State	Description
Lucy	Great Britain	The ship foundered before 13 November whilst on a voyage from "Cape Fare" to Hull, Yorkshire. Her crew were rescued by Catherine (Great Britain).

=== December ===
11 December

List of shipwrecks: 11 December 1750
Ship	State	Description
Young Victory	France	The ship exploded and sank during a battle with HMS Tryal ( (Kingdom of Great Britain) Royal Navy) off Barbados with the loss of about 30 crew.

=== Unknown date ===
List of shipwrecks: Unknown date 1750
Ship	State	Description
Elizabeth	Great Britain	The ship was driven ashore on Antigua whilst evading a French privateer.
Four ships		Next to Stad Bergen (see 28 March) four other vessels wrecked near Griend, the Netherlands in 1756.

== 1759 ==
=== April ===
19 April

List of shipwrecks: 19 April 1759
Ship	State	Description
HMS Falcon	(Kingdom of Great Britain) Royal Navy	The bomb vessel was wrecked on the Saintes, off Guadeloupe.

=== July ===
3 July

List of shipwrecks: 3 July 1759
Ship	State	Description
Tyrrel	(Kingdom of Great Britain) British America	The brig was wrecked at Cape Hatteras, North Carolina, with the loss of sixteen lives.

=== August ===
19 August

List of shipwrecks: 19 August 1759
Ship	State	Description
Océan	French Navy	Battle of Lagos: The third rate was run ashore and burnt in Almadora Bay.
Redoutable	French Navy	Battle of Lagos: The Téméraire-class ship of the line was run ashore and burnt in Almadora Bay.

=== September ===
12 September

List of shipwrecks: 12 September 1759
Ship	State	Description
Kuryer (Курьер, 'Courier')	Imperial Russian Navy	The packet boat ran aground and was wrecked 2 nautical miles (3.7 km) off Danzig with the loss of two lives. She was on a voyage from Danzig to Reval.

25 September

List of shipwrecks: 25 September 1759
Ship	State	Description
HMS Looe Hulk	(Kingdom of Great Britain) Royal Navy	The fifth rate was sunk as a breakwater at Harwich, Essex.

=== October ===
24 October

List of shipwrecks: 24 October 1759
Ship	State	Description
Industry	Great Britain	The ship was lost in the Saint Lawrence River. She was on a voyage from Quebec, New France, to London.
Providence	Great Britain	The ship was lost in the Saint Lawrence River. She was on a voyage from Quebec to London.

=== November ===
18 November

List of shipwrecks: 18 November 1759
Ship	State	Description
Mason	Great Britain	The ship was lost whilst on a voyage from London to Louisbourg, Nova Scotia, New France. Her crew were rescued.

20 November

List of shipwrecks: 20 November 1759
Ship	State	Description
HMS Resolution	(Kingdom of Great Britain) Royal Navy	HMS Resolution (right) Battle of Quiberon Bay: The third rate ship of the line ran aground and was wrecked on the Le Four Shoal, in Quiberon Bay.

21 November

List of shipwrecks: 21 November 1759
Ship	State	Description
Héros	French Navy	Battle of Quiberon Bay: The ship of the line ran aground and was scuttled in Quiberon Bay.
Juste	French Navy	Battle of Quiberon Bay: The ship of the line ran aground and sank in the Loire.
Soleil-Royal	French Navy	Battle of Quiberon Bay: The ship of the line ran aground and was scuttled in Quiberon Bay.

Unknown date

List of shipwrecks: Unknown date 1759
Ship	State	Description
Annanime	France	The privateer was lost off Cherbourg on or after 20 November.
Experiment	Great Britain	The ship was captured by the privateer Annanime (France) on 19 November whilst on a voyage from Virginia, British America, to London. She was sent in to Cherbourg but was lost off that port.
William	Great Britain	The sloop was captured by the privateer Annanime (France) on 20 November whilst on a voyage from Newfoundland, French America to Poole, Dorset. She was sent in to Cherbourg but was lost off that port.

=== December ===
4 December

List of shipwrecks: 4 December 1759
Ship	State	Description
HMS Mermaid	(Kingdom of Great Britain) Royal Navy	The sixth rate ran aground on Big Grand Cay, Bahamas. She was abandoned as a total loss on 6 January 1760.

5 December

List of shipwrecks: 5 December 1759
Ship	State	Description
Dubree Nombre de Jesus	Spain	The ship was driven ashore and wrecked at St Lucar. She was on a voyage from Bilbao to Málaga.
Maria Magdalena	Dutch Republic	The ship was driven ashore and wrecked at St Lucar.
Nossa Senhora do Bonfim	Portugal	The schooner was driven ashore and wrecked at St. Lucar.
Santa Joseph Mawein	Spain	The snow was driven ashore and wrecked at St. Lucar.
Southtalt	Dutch Republic	The ship was driven ashore and wrecked at St. Lucar.

13 December

List of shipwrecks: 13 December 1759
Ship	State	Description
Nossa Senhora da Penha de França	Portugal	The ship sank at Lisbon.

29 December

List of shipwrecks: 29 December 1759
Ship	State	Description
Nostra Señora Madre de Dios e Son Joze	Spain	The ship foundered in the Atlantic Ocean 1 nautical mile (1.9 km) north of the Cape Verde Islands.

31 December

List of shipwrecks: 31 December 1759
Ship	State	Description
Jonge Jan Jacob	Dutch Republic	The ship was lost on the coast of Brittany, France. She was on a voyage from Cowes, Isle of Wight, Great Britain, to Bordeaux, France.

Unknown date

List of shipwrecks: Unknown date December 1759
Ship	State	Description
Eliza	Great Britain	The ship was driven ashore and wrecked at Limerick, Ireland.
Happy Return	Great Britain	The ship foundered in the Irish Sea. Her crew were rescued. She was on a voyage from Workington, Cumberland, to Cork, Ireland.
Nostra Señora Piedade de Almas	Great Britain	The ship was lost near Folkestone, Kent, Great Britain. Her crew were rescued.
Salvator	Denmark	The ship was driven ashore and wrecked east of Dover, Kent. She was on a voyage from Málaga, Spain, to Rotterdam, Dutch Republic.
Stafford	Great Britain	The ship was driven ashore and damaged at Plymouth, Devon. She was on a voyage from New England, British America, to London. She was subsequently refloated and taken in to Plymouth for repairs.
Susanna	Great Britain	The ship was driven ashore and wrecked on Gotland, Sweden. She was on a voyage from Saint Petersburg, Russia, to London.

=== Unknown date ===
List of shipwrecks: Unknown date 1759
Ship	State	Description
Ancona	Great Britain	The galley foundered in the Gulf of Venice with the loss of most of her crew.
Armstrong	Ireland	The ship was driven ashore and wrecked on Grand Turk Island. She was on a voyage from Belfast, County Antrim, to Guadeloupe.
Judith	Great Britain	The ship was lost on Cape Roman, Carolina, British America. She was on a voyage from North Carolina to London.
Le Comte de la Rivière	Kingdom of France	The privateer was lost at sea with all hands.
Marlborough	Ireland	The ship was wrecked whilst on a voyage from Philadelphia, Pennsylvania, British America, to Derry.
Sally	Great Britain	The ship was driven ashore and wrecked at Boston, Massachusetts, British America.
Swan	Great Britain	The ship was lost in Morant Bay, Jamaica. She was on a voyage from Jamaica to Liverpool, Lancashire.
