= Frisian Islands =

Archipelago in the Wadden Sea

Coordinates: 53°57′N 8°30′E

Frisian Islands, Wadden Sea Islands
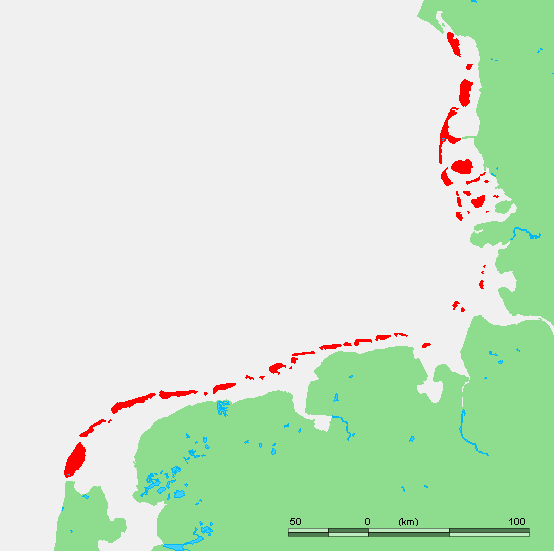
- The Wadden Islands archipelago, including the Frisian Islands
- Interactive map of Frisian Islands, Wadden Sea Islands

Geography
- Area: 1,047.49 km^{2} (404.44 sq mi)

Administration
- Netherlands, Germany, Denmark

Demographics
- Population: 81,341

The Frisian Islands, also known as the Wadden Islands or the Wadden Sea Islands, form an archipelago at the eastern edge of the North Sea in northwestern Europe, stretching from the northwest of the Netherlands through Germany to the west of Denmark. The islands shield the mudflat region of the Wadden Sea (large parts of which fall dry during low tide) from the North Sea.

The Frisian Islands, along with the mainland coast in the German Bight, form the region of Frisia (German and Dutch: Friesland), homeland of the Frisian people. Generally, the term Frisian Islands is used for the islands where Frisian is spoken and the population is ethnically Frisian. In contrast, the term "Wadden Islands" applies to the entire archipelago, including the Dutch-speaking westernmost islands of Texel and Vlieland, Danish-speaking Danish Wadden Sea Islands further north off the west coast of Jutland and the Islands of Trischen and Neuwerk.

Most of the Wadden Sea Islands are environmentally protected areas, and an international wildlife nature reserve is being coordinated between the Netherlands, Germany and Denmark. Natural gas and oil drilling continue, however, and in the vicinity of the Ems, Weser and Elbe estuaries, ship traffic causes tension between wildlife protection and economic values.

== History ==
=== Origins ===
During the last ice age, which ended approximately 12,000 years ago, sea level was about 60 metres (200 ft) lower than it is now, and part of what is now the North Sea was dry land. With the melting of the ice caps, the sea level rose, reaching the current coast line around the beginning of the Holocene era, approximately 7,000 years ago. Tidal action transported large quantities of sand to form a line of dunes extending over 500 kilometres (310 mi) from the Netherlands to the mouth of the river Elbe in Germany. The sea broke through the dunes in many places to form the Wadden Islands, with the low-lying country behind becoming the tidal Wadden mudflats.

==== Island forming ====
The Dutch West Frisian and the German East Frisian Islands are barrier islands. They arose along the breakers' edge where the water surge piled up sediment, and behind which sediment was carried away by the breaking waves. Over time, shoals arose, which ultimately were only covered by infrequent storm floods. Once plants began to colonize the sandbanks, the land began to stabilize.

In contrast, the North Frisian Islands arose from the remains of old Geestland islands, where the land was partially removed by storm floods and water action and then separated from the mainland. They are, therefore, often higher and their cores are less exposed to changes than the islands to the south. Beyond the core, however, the same processes are at work, as is particularly evident on Sylt, where the south of the island threatens to be broken away and the harbour at List in the north silts up. The Danish Islands, the next in the chain to the north, arose from sandbanks. Into the 20th century, silt on the islands was a serious problem. To protect them, small woods were planted.

=== Habitation ===
Long before the beginning of the modern era, there were already humans inhabiting the Wadden area. Up to 800 AD, most inhabitants lived on terpen (artificial mounds). Living conditions were difficult. The Roman naturalist Pliny, writing in the first century AD, described the Frisians as ...

... people who live without trees or shrubs. ... in the east, to the coasts of the ocean, a number of races in such needy conditions exist; but this also applies to the races of peoples which are called the large and small Chaucen, which we have seen in the north. There, two times in each period of a day and a night, the ocean with a fast tide submerges an immense plain, thereby the hiding ... whether the area is sea or land. There this miserable race inhabits raised pieces ground or platforms, which they have moored by hand above the level of the highest known tide. Living in huts built on the chosen spots, they seem like sailors in ships if water covers the surrounding country, but like shipwrecked people when the tide has withdrawn itself, and around their huts they catch fish which try to escape with the expiring tide. It is for them not possible to keep herds and live on milk such as the surrounding tribes. They cannot even fight with wild animals, because all the bush country lies too far away. They braid ropes of sedges and rushes from the marshes with which they make nets to be able to catch fish, and they dig up mud with their hands and dry it more in wind than in the sun, and with soil as fuel they heat their food and their own bodies, frozen in northern wind. Their only drink comes from storing rain water in tanks front of their houses. And these are the races which, if they were now conquered by the Roman nation, say that they will fall into slavery! It is only too true: Destiny saves people as a punishment.

Around 1000AD, dike construction began. Monks were instrumental in this activity, among others those of the monastery of Aduard. But earlier attempts had been undertaken to dam the sea. At the Frisian Peins (near Franeker), a 40-meter section of dike has been discovered that is thought to date from the 1st or 2nd century BC.

In the late Middle Ages, the dike system was gradually strengthened and flooding diminished. Beginning in the 17th century, dikes were built further out to reclaim more land. This activity peaked in the 19th and 20th centuries.

=== Conservation of the West Frisian/Dutch coast ===
The dunes south of the Wadden Sea were also liable to this process, but human intervention prevented the many storm surges from changing the coast of the provinces North Holland and South Holland into separate islands with Wadden mudflats behind them. However, around 1200AD, storm surges did break up the northern coast of Western Friesland into five islands. Around 1600AD, four of these along the West coast had been again recovered, but Wieringen, to the south-east of Texel, remained an island up to the 20th century.

== Archaeology ==
In 2019, Dutch maritime investigators unearthed a 16th century shipwreck during a search for containers from MSC Zoe. According to Holland’s National Office for Cultural Heritage, the ship was built circa 1540 in the Netherlands during the reign of Charles V. Researchers also found copper plates with emblem of the Fugger family and wooden beams with a sleek hull about 30 metres long.

== Embankment of the mudflat ==
In Friesland and Groningen plans were made to embank and drain the Wadden Sea. As a result, the islands would have become part of the mainland. As of today, nature and environmental movements have been able to prevent this.

The only plan ever to be carried out was the construction of a causeway from the Frisian Holwerd to Ameland, in 1872, which was not very successful. Shortly after construction, the causeway had already suffered so much storm damage that the dam was abandoned in 1882. The dam has been almost entirely eroded since then.

In the northern Wadden Sea building dams proved to be considerably simpler. Nordstrand is now so much linked to the rampart by dikes that it is difficult to define it as an island, and also Langeness, Oland, Nordstrandischmoor, Hamburger Hallig, Sylt, and Rømø are all reachable by dams. Mandø is even reachable without a dam by means of tidal road.

== Development ==
=== Migration ===
The Wadden Islands are in continuous apparent movement. The most important movement is the 'migration': the islands themselves are slowly but certainly moving from West to East. On the West side most of the islands disappear slowly into the sea and on the East side even larger sand-banks arise. This movement is also the reason that most of the villages themselves are on the West side of their island. When they were founded they were situated in the center. Over the course of the last few centuries, many houses and even entire villages disappeared into the sea.

=== Hook shaping ===
The second movement is the development of a hook shape. Along the sea breaches hook-shaped sand ridges arise, which change form with the moving of the sea arm. By growth of these hooks new shoals arise such as the Noorderhaaks and Zuiderhaaks. Sometimes such a shoal grows, originating where an island has been 'walking', and the island regains area.

== Islands ==
=== Dutch Wadden Islands ===
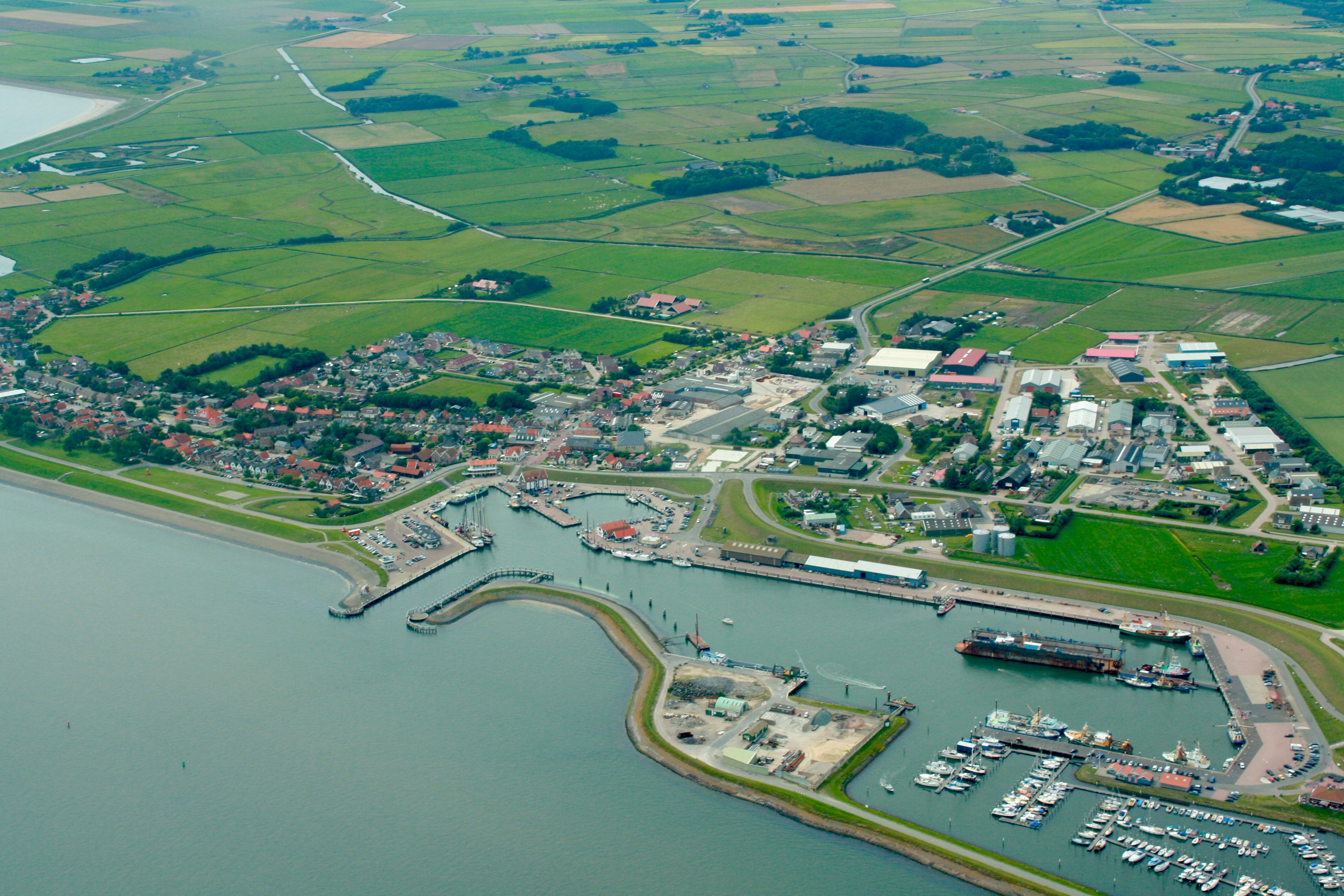
Aerial view of Oudeschild on Texel

(from West to East)

==== Inhabited ====
- Texel (largest of all Frisian Islands and most populous of the West Frisian Islands)
- Vlieland
- Terschelling
- Ameland
- Schiermonnikoog

The Dutch islands have a surface of 405.2 km² and a total of 23,872 inhabitants. The former island of Wieringen can be found at the top of North Holland, against the Afsluitdijk. Huisduinen and Callantsoog also used to be islands in the area.

==== Uninhabited ====
- Noorderhaaks
- Richel
- Griend
- Rif
- Engelsmanplaat
- Simonszand
- Rottumerplaat
- Rottumeroog
- Zuiderduintjes

The names of all these places suggest this is the transition area between island and shoal (plaat in Dutch). Noorderhaaks, Griend, Rottumerplaat and Rottumeroog are generally considered to be islands, the others are considered to be sandbars and disappear from time to time into the waves.

=== German Wadden Islands ===
(from West to East and South to North)

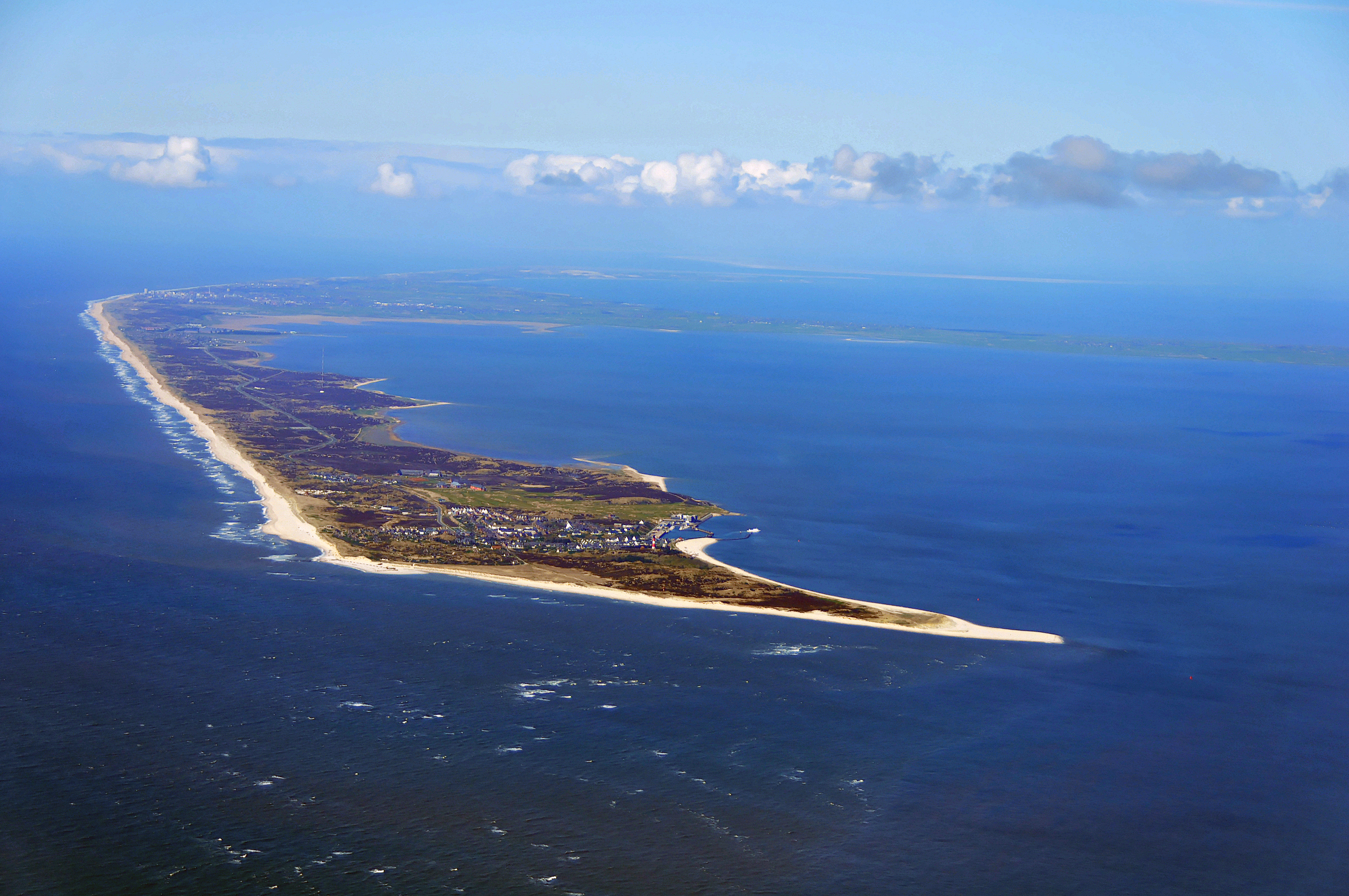
Aerial view of Sylt

==== Inhabited ====
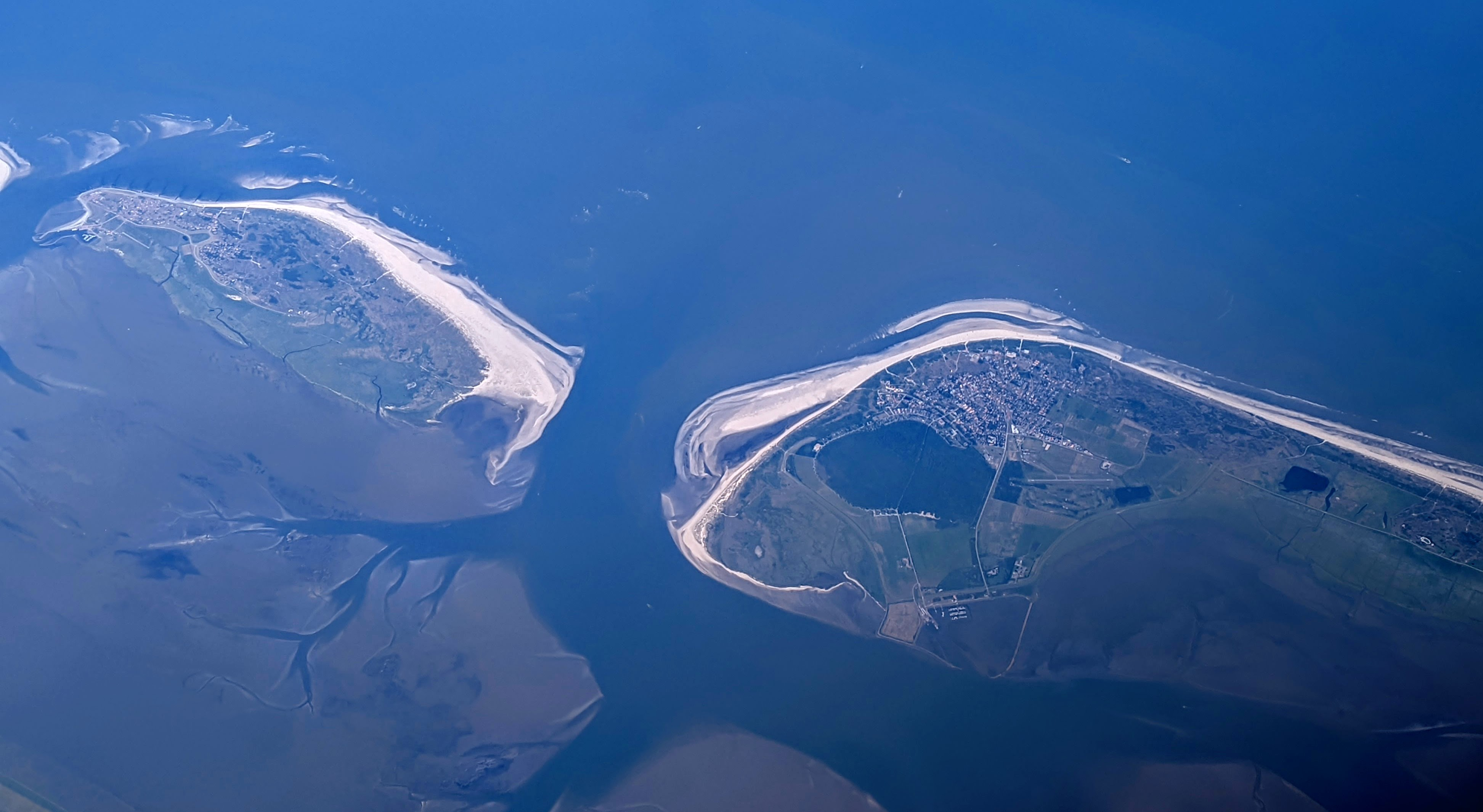
Baltrum and Langeoog

- Borkum
- Juist
- Norderney
- Baltrum
- Langeoog
- Spiekeroog
- Wangerooge
- Neuwerk
- Pellworm
- Nordstrand (presently mainland)
- Inhabited Halligen
- Amrum
- Föhr
- Sylt

==== Uninhabited ====
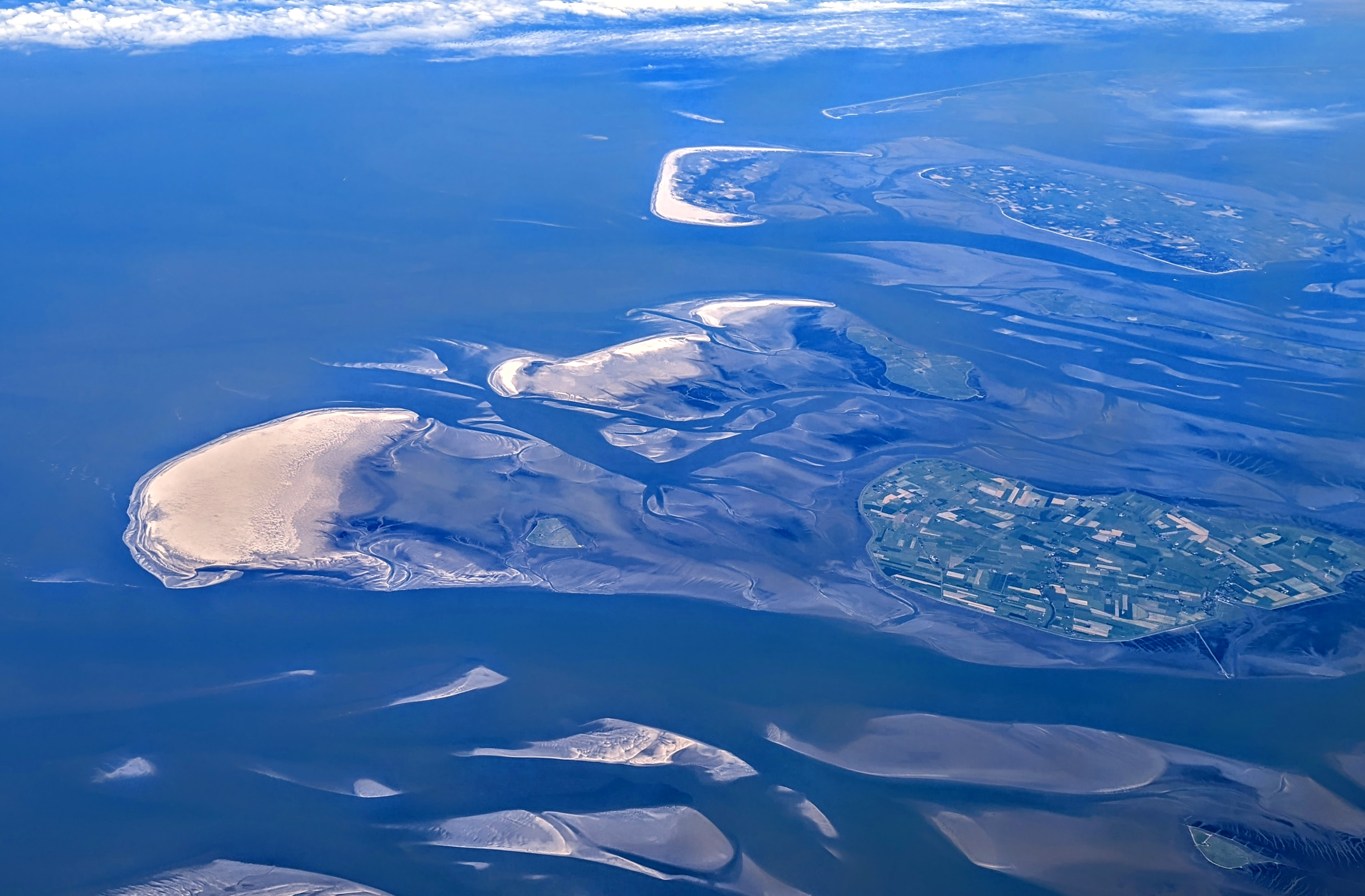
Süderoogsand, Norderoogsand, Japsand (uninhabited shoals or sand bars, left and center), and Amrum (top), with Pellworm and Föhr (green areas) at the right

- Lütje Hörn
- Kachelotplate
- Memmert
- Minsener Oog
- Alte Mellum
- Großer Knechtsand
- Nigehörn
- Scharhörn
- Trischen
- Tertius (frequently submerged)
- Blauort
- Süderoogsand
- Norderoogsand
- Japsand
- Uninhabited Halligen (Habel, Südfall, Norderoog)

The German islands have a surface of 448.52 km² (173 sq. mi.) and 53,296 inhabitants. It is possible to make a boat excursion from several German Wadden Islands to the small rock island of Helgoland which is situated 70 km (43 mi) off the German coast. Although Heligoland (German: Helgoland) is not a Wadden Island, there are strong cultural links with the Wadden area; for example a dialect of North Frisian is spoken there.

Not all these islands are officially considered to be Wadden Islands. For the definition of an island, a minimum of 160 hectares (0.6 sq. mi.) must no longer be submerged during average high water by the North Sea.

=== Danish Wadden Islands ===
(from South to North)

- Rømø
- Mandø
- Koresand (uninhabited)
- Fanø
- Langli (uninhabited)

In the 20th century, south of the Danish island Rømø lay the small island Jordsand, which sank in 1999. North of the Danish island Fanø the sand coast has been opened and closed numerous times in the course of history, but at the moment the coast line is closed, and forms a whole again except for two west coast fjords. The Danish islands have a total surface of 193.8 km² (74.5 sq. mi.) and 4,173 inhabitants.

== Gallery ==
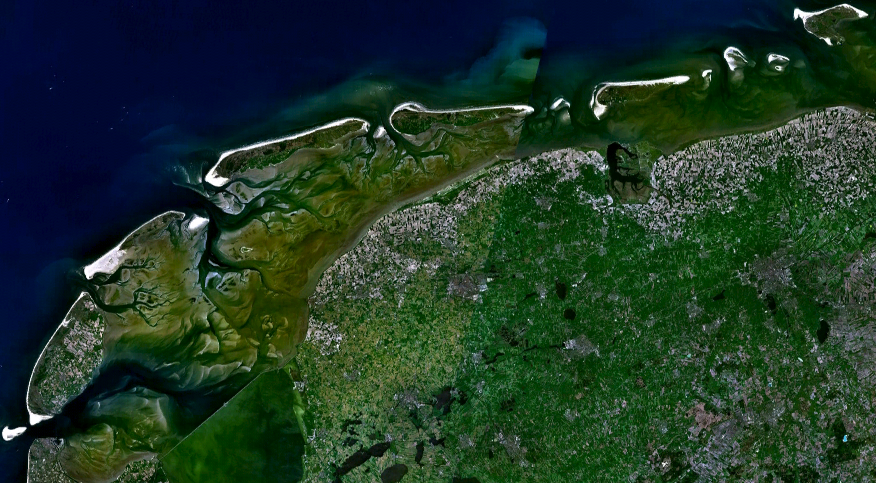
Satellite image of the Dutch islands

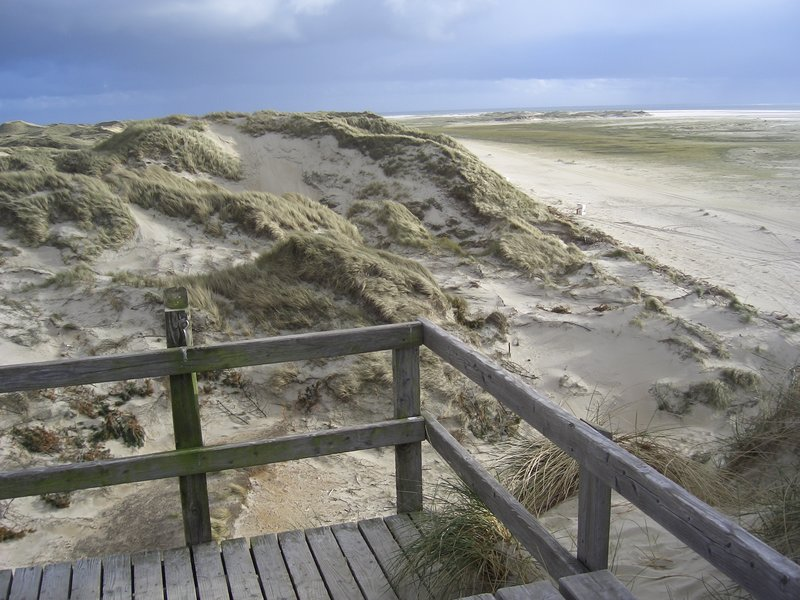
Sand dunes and beach on Amrum

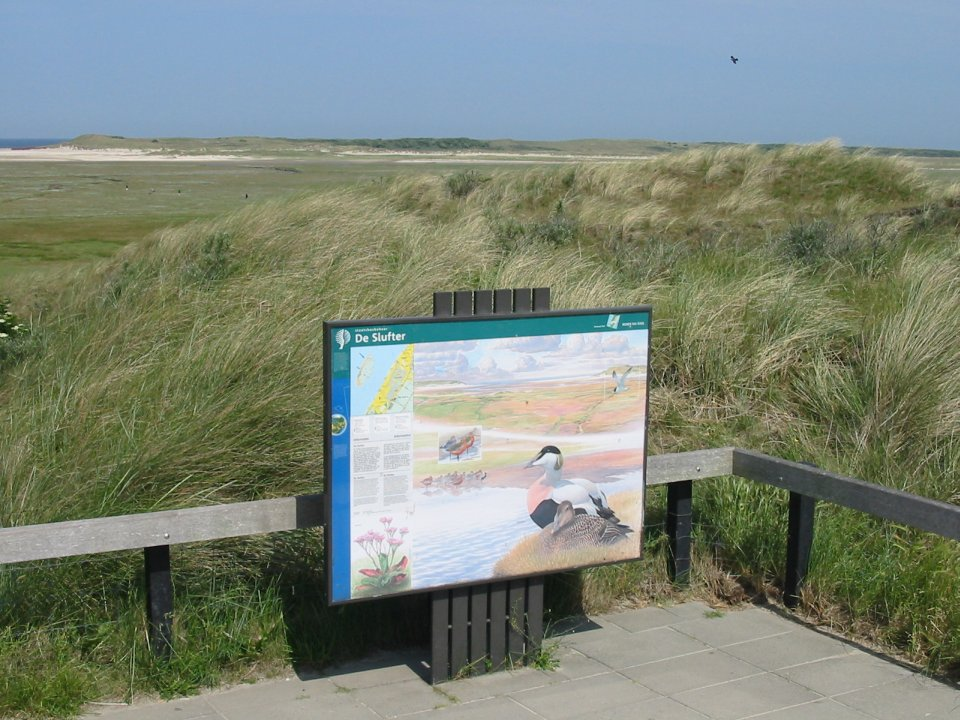
De Slufter, a nature reserve on Texel

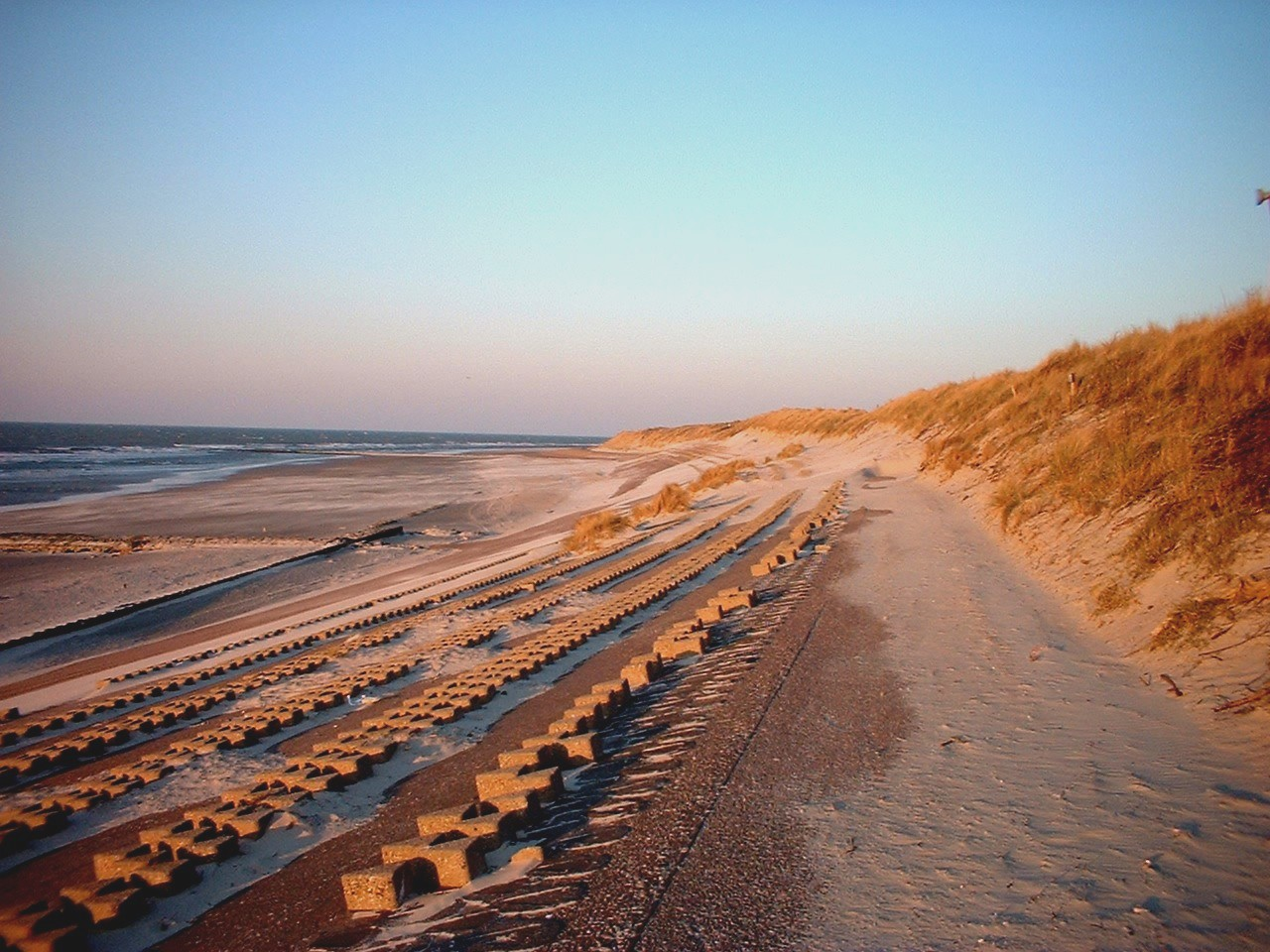
Fortified coast line on Wangerooge

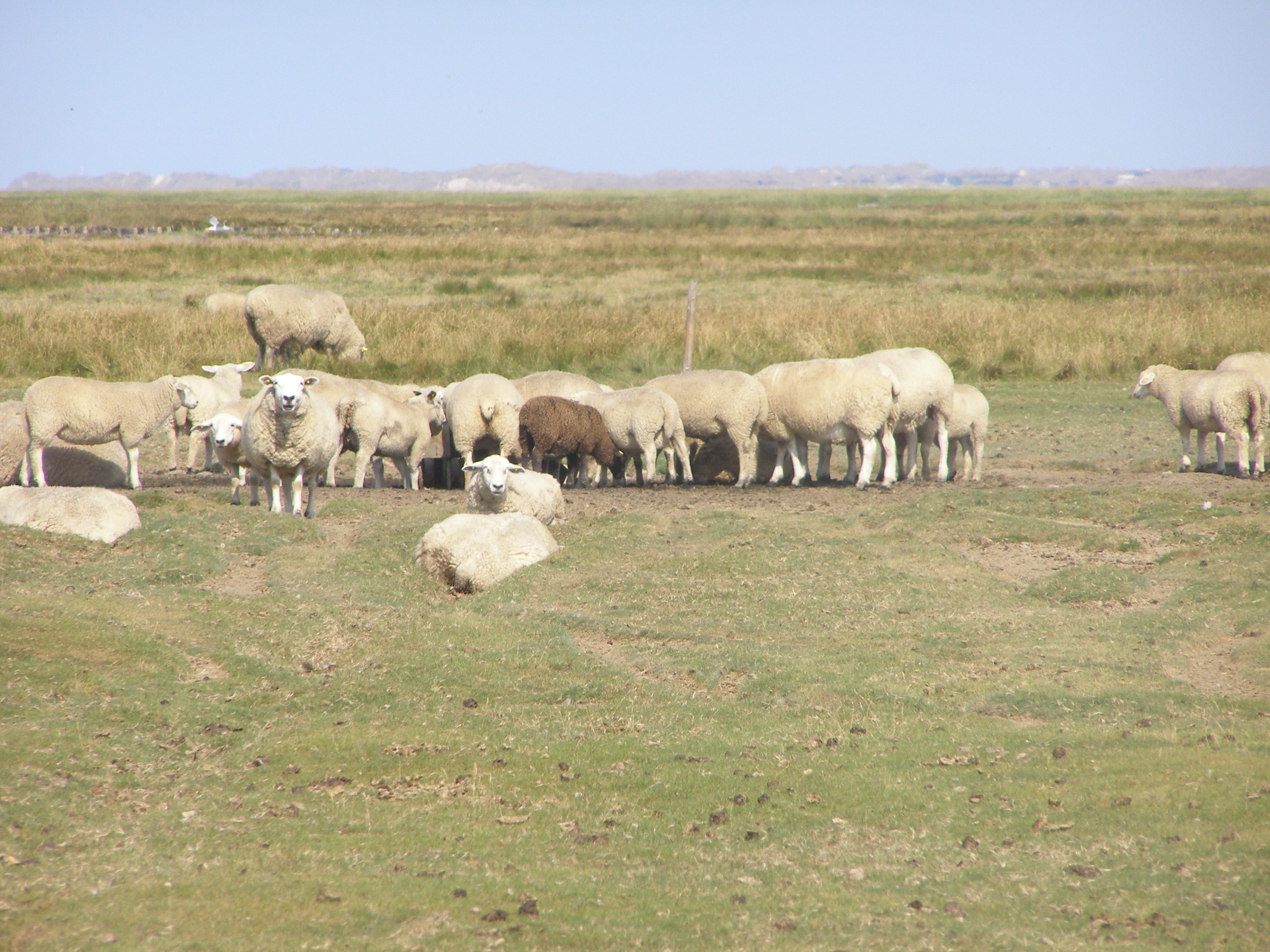
Sheep grazing on Mandø

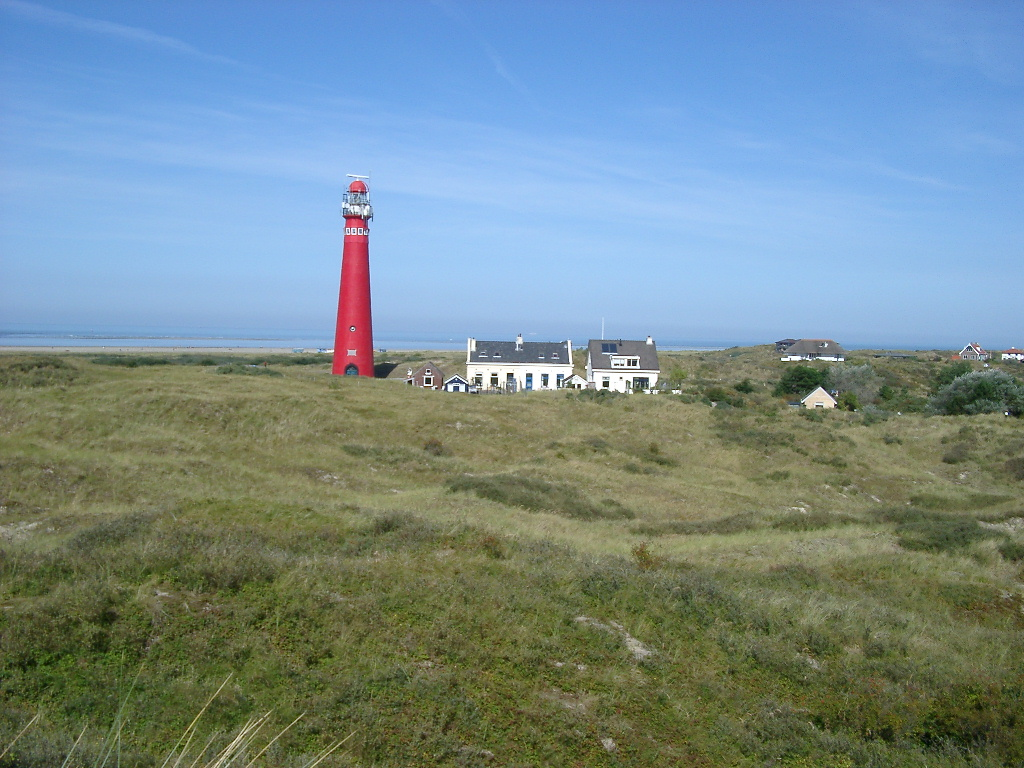
Lighthouse on Schiermonnikoog

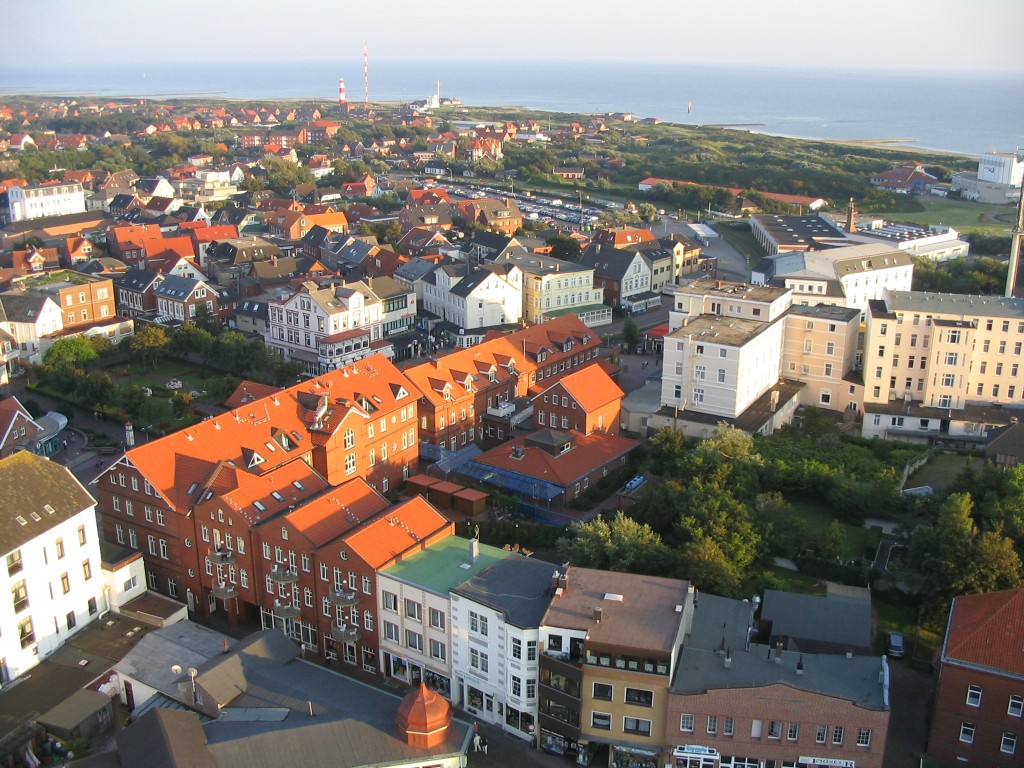
View from the lighthouse of Borkum

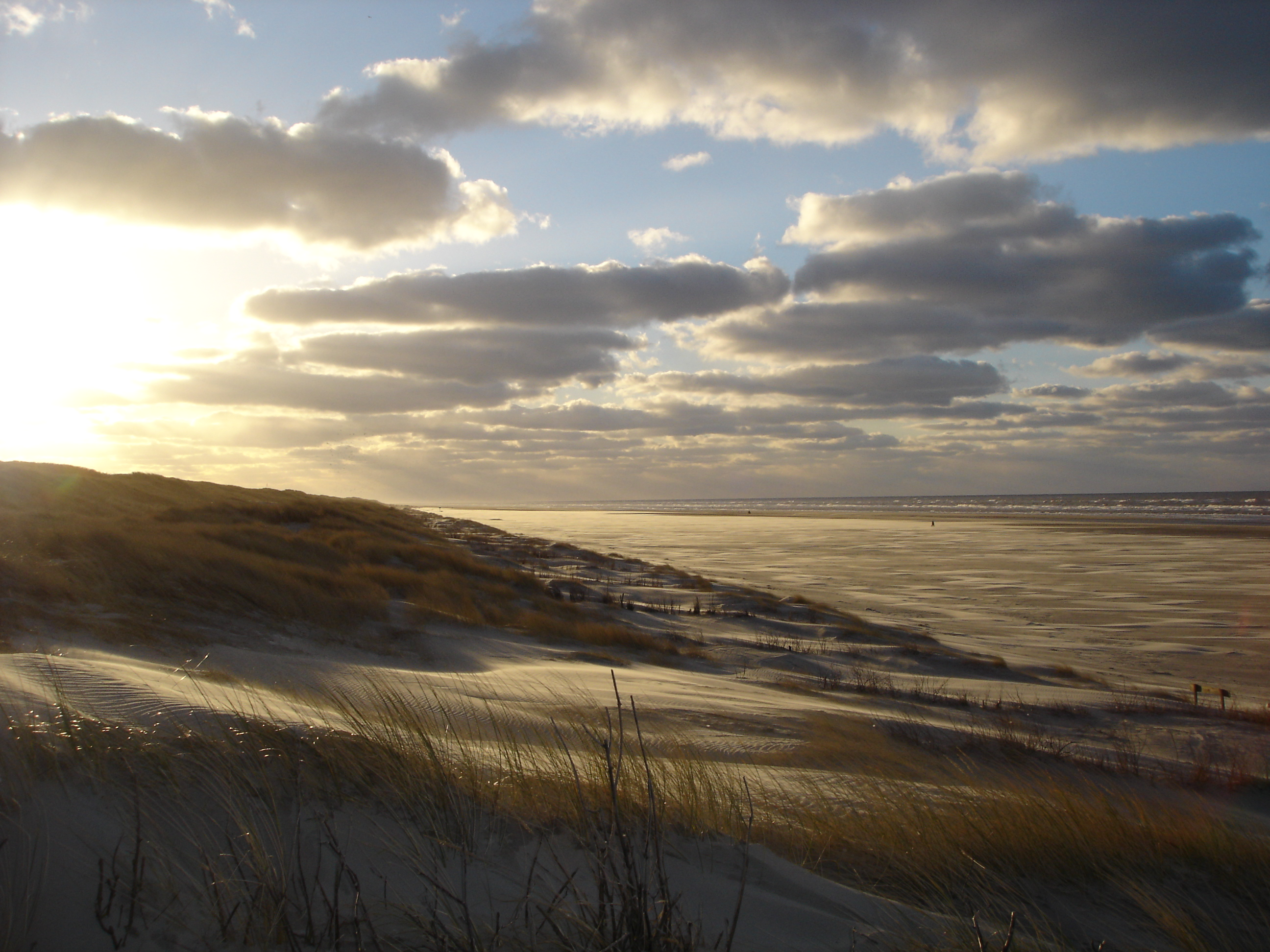
Beach on Juist

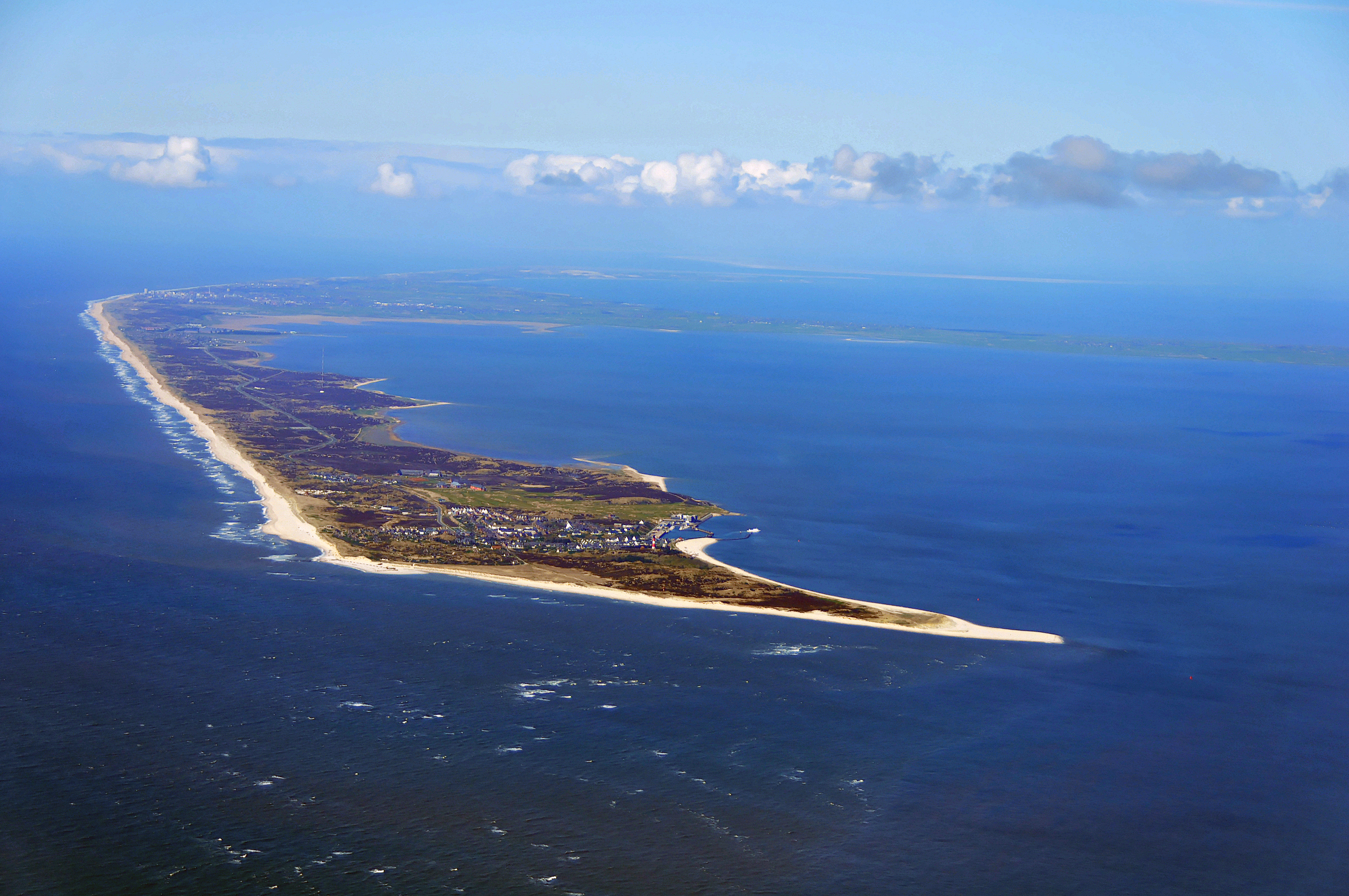
Aerial view of Sylt

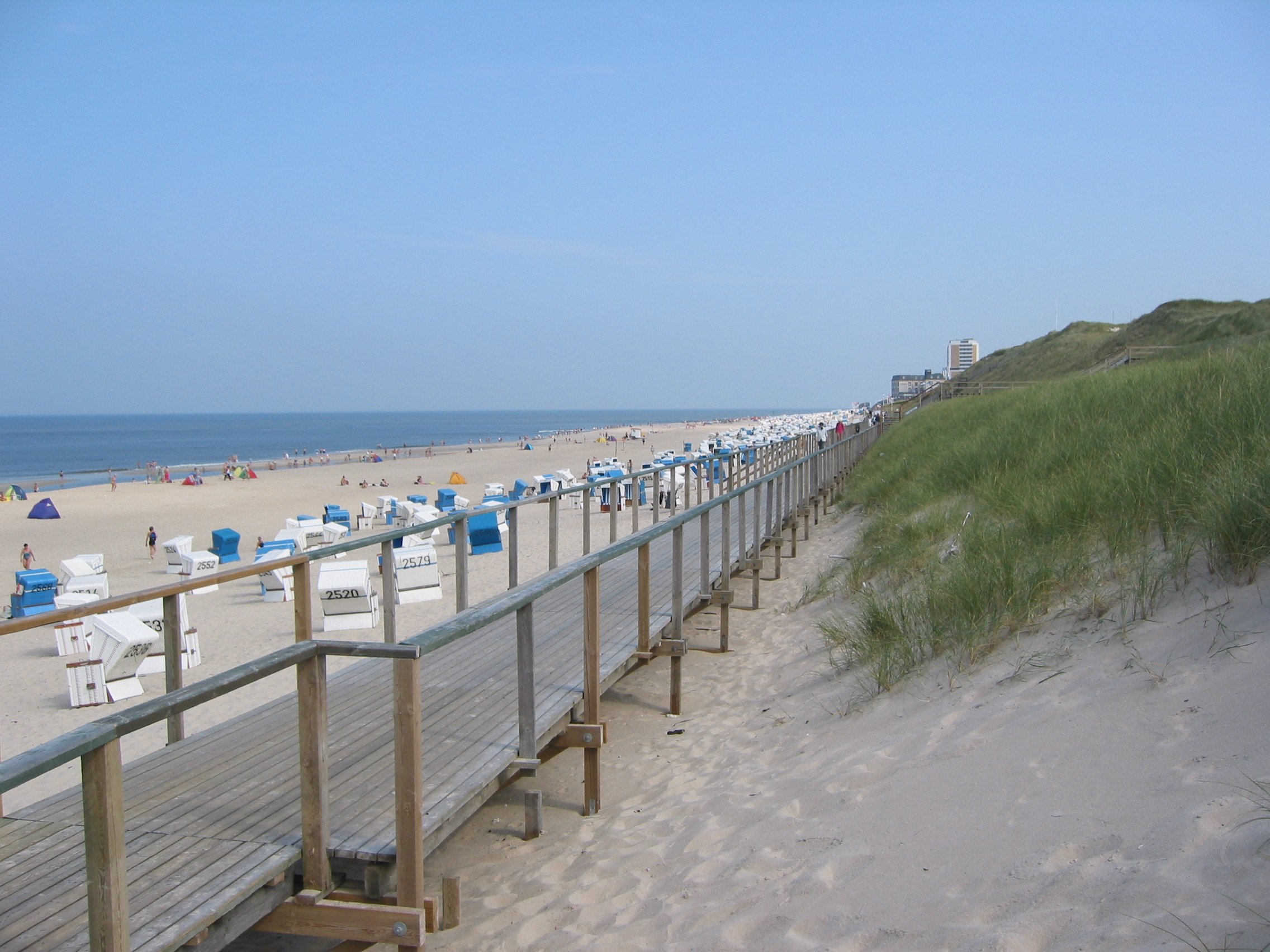
Beach on Sylt

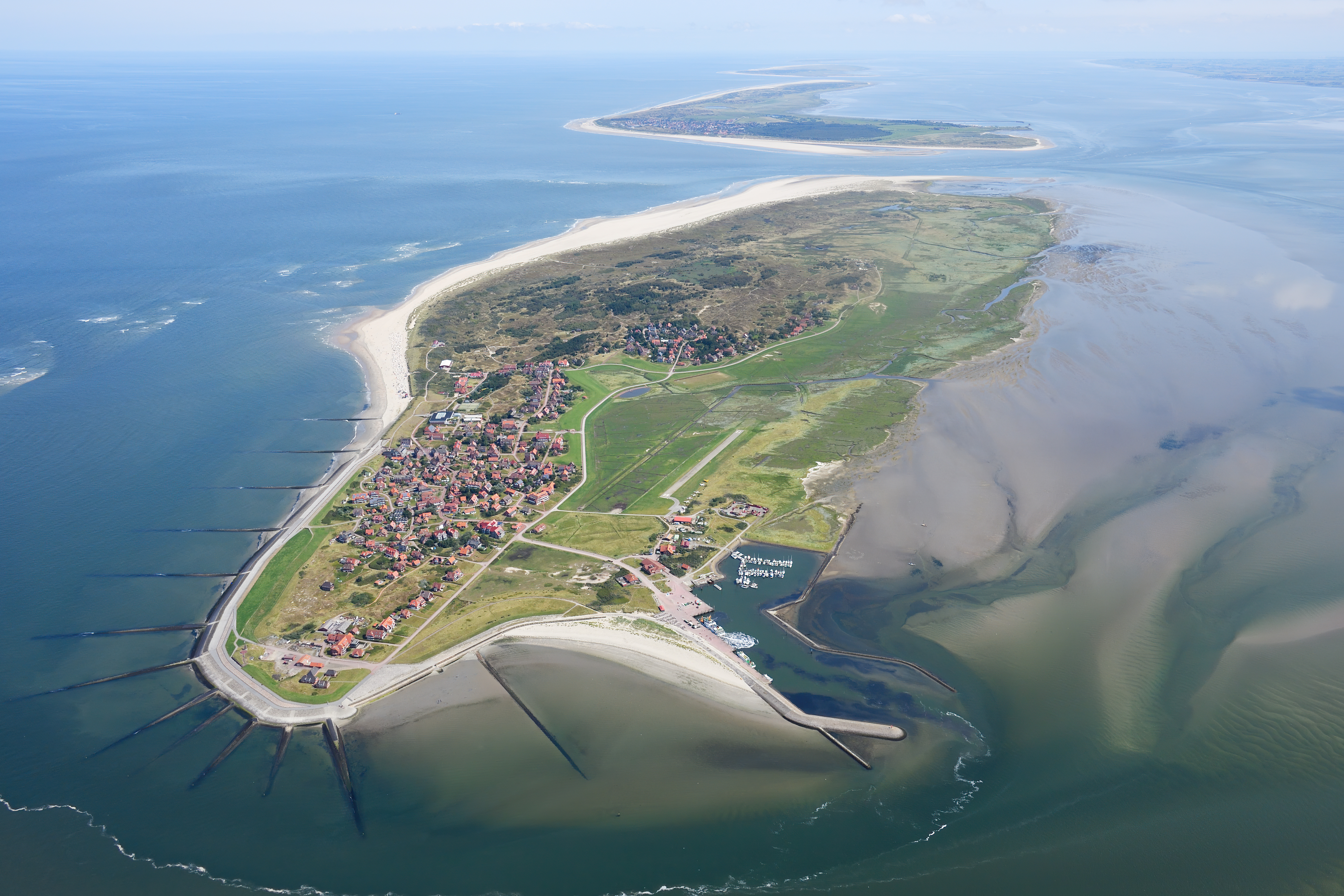
Bird's-eye view of Baltrum

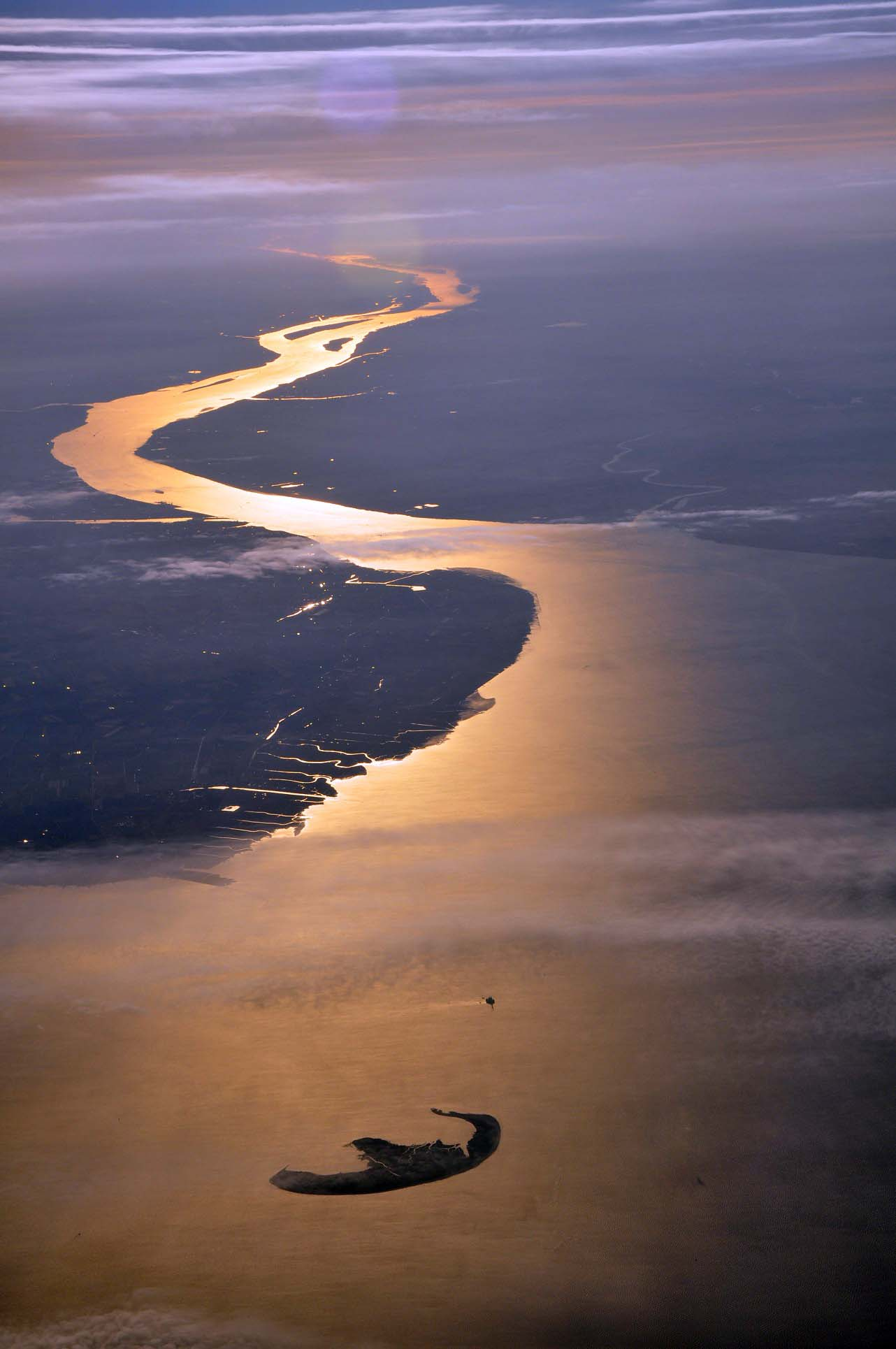
The island Trischen with the mouth of the river Elbe
