= Oan Schylge =

National anthem

Oan Schylge is the anthem of Terschelling, one of the West Frisian Islands in the northern Netherlands. The lyrics were written in 1854 by Jacob Sijbrands Bakker in the West Frisian dialect spoken on the island. "Schylge" is the name of Terschelling in local Frisian, and "Oan Schylge" means "To Terschelling". The origin of the music is uncertain: It was perhaps composed by Hendrik Rotgans (1851–1910), but could also have been borrowed from an older folk song. At most occasions, only the first and the last verse are sung.

== Original text ==
Oan Skîllinge.
(Skîlger tongslag.)

O Skîlge mîn lândje
Wat hab ik di jeaf,
O wa di net prîset
Di fînt mi toch deaf;

Dan slût ik mîn eeren,
Of geet it te bont,
Dan kan ik net swîje,
Mar straf se terstont.

O Skîlge mîn lândje!
Soa droeg en soa heag,
Wat leisto dir frolik
De Noardsé în 't eag.

Hoa trots bin dîn dunen
Hoa wît is dîn sân,
Hoa grien bin dîn helmen
Mîn jeaf Skîlgerlân.

O Skîlge mîn lândje,
Do leist mi oan 't hart,
Wa di net ris prîset,
Di dogt di te kort.

Soa lang asto steetste,
Soa fest op dîn sân,
Wæs fol brave minsken
Mîn jeaf Skîlgerlân!

J. S. Bakker.

== Some other text and translation ==
O, Schylge, myn lântse,
wat hab ik dy jeaf,
Al wa dy net priizet,
dy fynt my toch deaf.

Dan slút ik myn earen,
of geet it te bont,
Dan kan ik net swye,
mar straf se terstont.

O Schylge, myn lântse,
sò droeg en sò heag
Wat leisto dir froalik,
de Noardsee yn't eag

Hò trots bin dyn dunen,
hò wyt is dyn sân
Hò grien bin dyn helmen,
myn jeaf Schylgerlân

O Schylge, myn lântse,
do leist my oant hort
Wa dy net ris priizet,
dy dogt dy te kort

Sò lang asto steeste,
sò fest op dyn sân
Wês fol brave minsken,
myn jeaf Schylgerlân

Translation:

O, Terschelling my little land,
how much do I love you
All who do not praise you,
will just find me deaf

Then I close my ears,
but if it goes to far
Then I can not remain silent,
and punish them immediately

O, Terschelling my little land
so high and so dry
You happily lie there
facing the North Sea

How proud are your dunes,
how white is your sand
How green is your beachgrass,
my beloved Terschellingerland

O Terschelling, my little land,
you are embraced in my heart
Who does not praise you from time to time,
is not worthy of you

For as long as you remain standing,
so steadfast on your sand
Be full of honest people,
my beloved Terschellingerland
