= Stad Bergen =

Dutch 18-century galiot

History

Dutch Republic
- Name: Stad Bergen
- Owner: Arnold Hooghart
- Out of service: 28 March 1756
- Fate: wrecked at Griend, the Netherland on 28 March 1756

General characteristics
- Type: Galiot
- Tonnage: 50 BRT
- Beam: 5 meter
- Sail plan: one mast

Stad Bergen was a Dutch 18th-century one-masted galiot. The ship weighed 50 BRT and had a depth of 5 metres. Its home port was Terschelling. The ship was owned by Arnold Hooghart, a merchant from Amsterdam. The captain of the ship was Cornelis Wopkes Vos from Terschelling.

== Fate ==
In March 1753 she was on voyage to Norway. On 28 March 1753 she wrecked near the Dutch island Griend on the east wall of the Vliestroom. Cornelis Wopkes Vos survived the accident and some inventory was salvaged before the ship was lost. Cornelis Wopkes Vos was killed in 1767 by the sinking of his ship “De Jonge Juffrouw Geertruida Anna” in March 1767 in the bay of Audierne in Brittany, France.

== Wreck ==
Over 200 years later, in 1985, a fisherman found the wreck. After research in various archives and later research by Frank van Peperstraten it is concluded that it is the wreck of “Stad Bergen”.

After the discovery in 1985, a diving team from Harlingen found at the wreck a large quantity of Frisian roof tiles and bricks and many shards of Lower Rhine pottery, including five plates with the year 1756. Furthermore a number of copper tobacco boxes with engravings were found and many objects of belongings of the crew. Another diving team recovered two one-meters long cast-iron cannons in 2005.
