= Rif (sandbank) =

Sandbank in the Dutch Wadden Sea

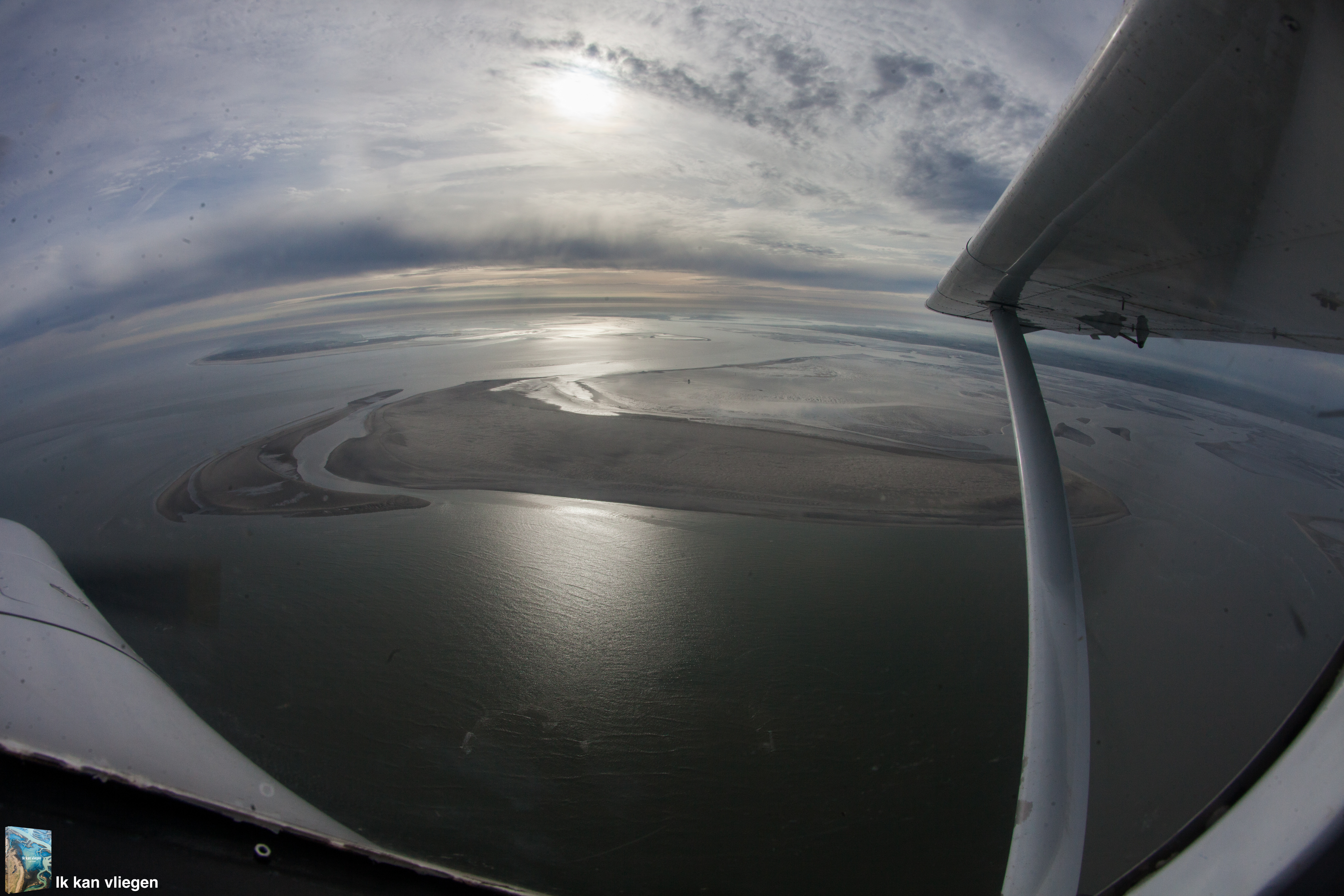
- Aerial view of Rif

- Map of Rif (top) and Engelsmanplaat (bottom)

Geography
- Coordinates: 53°28′12″N 6°2′20″E
- Archipelago: (West) Frisian Islands
- Adjacent to: Wadden Sea, North Sea
- Area: 0.9 km^{2} (0.35 sq mi)

Administration
- Netherlands
- Province: Friesland
- Municipalities: Noardeast-Fryslân and Schiermonnikoog

Demographics
- Population: Uninhabited

Rif (Dutch pronunciation: [rɪf]) is a sandbank in the Dutch Wadden Sea, lying between Ameland and Schiermonnikoog, north of Engelsmanplaat. The sandbank has an area of 0.9 square kilometres (0.35 mi^{2}) at high tide and is popular as a high-tide resting area for birds as well as for seals. Additionally, the sandbank is a breeding place for birds and seals use it to give birth on.
