= West Frisian Islands =

Chain of islands off the north coast of the Netherlands

Coordinates: 53°22′N 5°20′E

Native name: Waddeneilanden (Dutch) Waadeilannen (West Frisian)
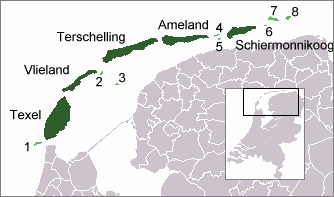
- The islands. Uninhabited islands are numbered, from west to east: 1. Noorderhaaks; 2. Richel; 3. Griend; 4. Rif; 5. Engelsmanplaat; 6. Simonszand; 7. Rottumerplaat; 8. Rottumeroog.
- Interactive map of West Frisian Islands

Geography
- Location: Wadden Sea
- Archipelago: Frisian Islands
- Total islands: 14
- Major islands: Texel, Terschelling, Ameland, Schiermonnikoog, Vlieland

Administration
- Netherlands
- Provinces: North Holland; Friesland; Groningen

Demographics
- Population: 23,872
- Ethnic groups: Frisians, Dutch

The West Frisian Islands (Dutch: Waddeneilanden, pronounced [ˈʋɑdə(n)ˌɛilɑndə(n)]; West Frisian: Waadeilannen) are a chain of islands in the North Sea off the northern Dutch coast, along the edge of the Wadden Sea. They continue further east as the German East Frisian Islands and are part of the Frisian Islands.

From west to east the islands are: Noorderhaaks, Texel, Vlieland, Richel, Griend, Terschelling, Ameland, Rif, Engelsmanplaat, Schiermonnikoog, Simonszand, Rottumerplaat, Rottumeroog, and Zuiderduintjes.

The Frisian Islands are nowadays mostly famous as a holiday destination. Island hopping is possible by regular ferries from the mainland and by specialised tour operators. Cycling is the most favourable means of transport on most of the islands. On Vlieland and Schiermonnikoog cars are allowed only for regular inhabitants.

== Geography ==
The island chain represents the remains of a glacially formed sandbank, and may have once been the former coastline of the Netherlands, before it was breached and flooded to form the Wadden Sea many thousands of years ago.

== Comparison ==
Inhabited islands
Island / municipality	Administrative province	Area (km^{2})	Population	Capital
Texel	North Holland	463.16	13,656	Den Burg
Vlieland	Friesland	315.80	1,194	Oost-Vlieland
Terschelling	Friesland	673.99	4,870	West-Terschelling
Ameland	Friesland	268.50	3,746	Ballum
Schiermonnikoog	Friesland	199.07	931	Schiermonnikoog

The islands Noorderhaaks and Texel are part of the province of North Holland. The islands Vlieland, Richel, Griend, Terschelling, Ameland, Rif, Engelsmanplaat, and Schiermonnikoog are part of the province of Friesland. The small islands Simonszand, Rottumerplaat, Rottumeroog, and Zuiderduintjes belong to the province of Groningen.

== See also ==
- List of lighthouses in Friesland
