= Richel =

Sandbank in the Netherlands

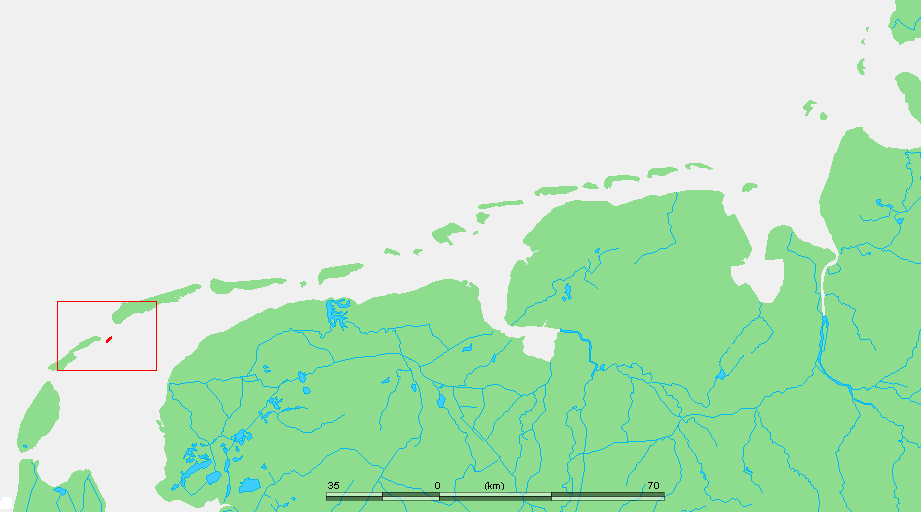
- Location of Richel in the Wadden Sea

Geography
- Coordinates: 53°17′50″N 5°8′05″E
- Archipelago: (West) Frisian Islands
- Adjacent to: Wadden Sea

Administration
- Netherlands
- Province: Friesland
- Municipality: Vlieland

Demographics
- Population: Uninhabited

Richel (Dutch pronunciation: [ˈrɪxəl]; English: Ridge), or rather De Richel (The Ridge), is a permanently dry sandbank in the Wadden Sea, in the gap between the Dutch islands of Vlieland and Terschelling. It is located about 1 kilometer east of the northernmost point of Vlieland and is administered by the municipality of Vlieland. The sandbank has an average surface area of 116 hectares. It is completely flooded only during extremely high tides.

The island is primarily known as the most important breeding place in the Wadden Sea for grey seals. More than 300 pups are born on Richel in winter. In summer seals seem to prefer areas more sheltered from human contact. The sandbank is also important as a breeding and feeding area for ringed plovers, Kentish plovers, little terns and other bird species.

Richel is uninhabited and virtually barren. It is too low to support any permanent vegetation. The sandbank is only able to support some temporary colonisation by the grass species sand couch (Elytrigia juncea).

The ferry between Harlingen and Vlieland passes by Richel, making a detour around the sandbank. During low tide, it is possible to walk to the sandbank from Vlieland (see mudflat hiking) although Richel is off-limits to humans due to its importance as a nature area. Boat trips from Vlieland used to be organised daily during the summer tourist season to observe the seal population on Richel.
