= Simonszand =

Sandbank in the Netherlands

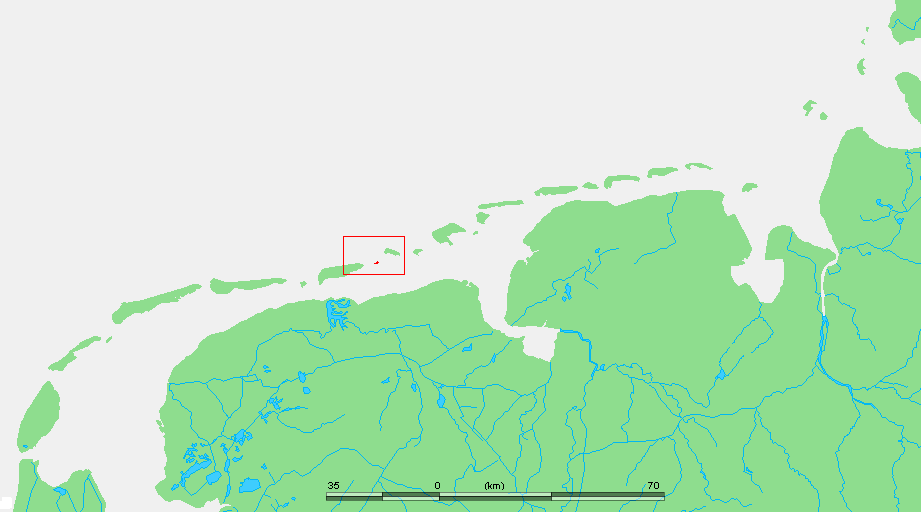
- Location of Simonszand

Geography
- Coordinates: 53°31′N 6°24′E
- Archipelago: (West) Frisian Islands
- Adjacent to: North Sea; Wadden Sea

Administration
- Netherlands
- Province: Groningen
- Municipality: Het Hogeland

Demographics
- Population: Uninhabited

Simonszand (Dutch pronunciation: [ˈsimɔn(s)ˌsɑnt]) is a sandbank between the West Frisian Islands of Schiermonnikoog and Rottumerplaat in the Netherlands. It is located in the municipality of Het Hogeland in the province of Groningen.

The sandbank was originally mapped as being an Intertidal zone in approximately 1811, but changed in later mappings to be shown as a Supratidal zone after it became larger and migrated seaward.
