= Noorderhaaks =

Island in the Netherlands

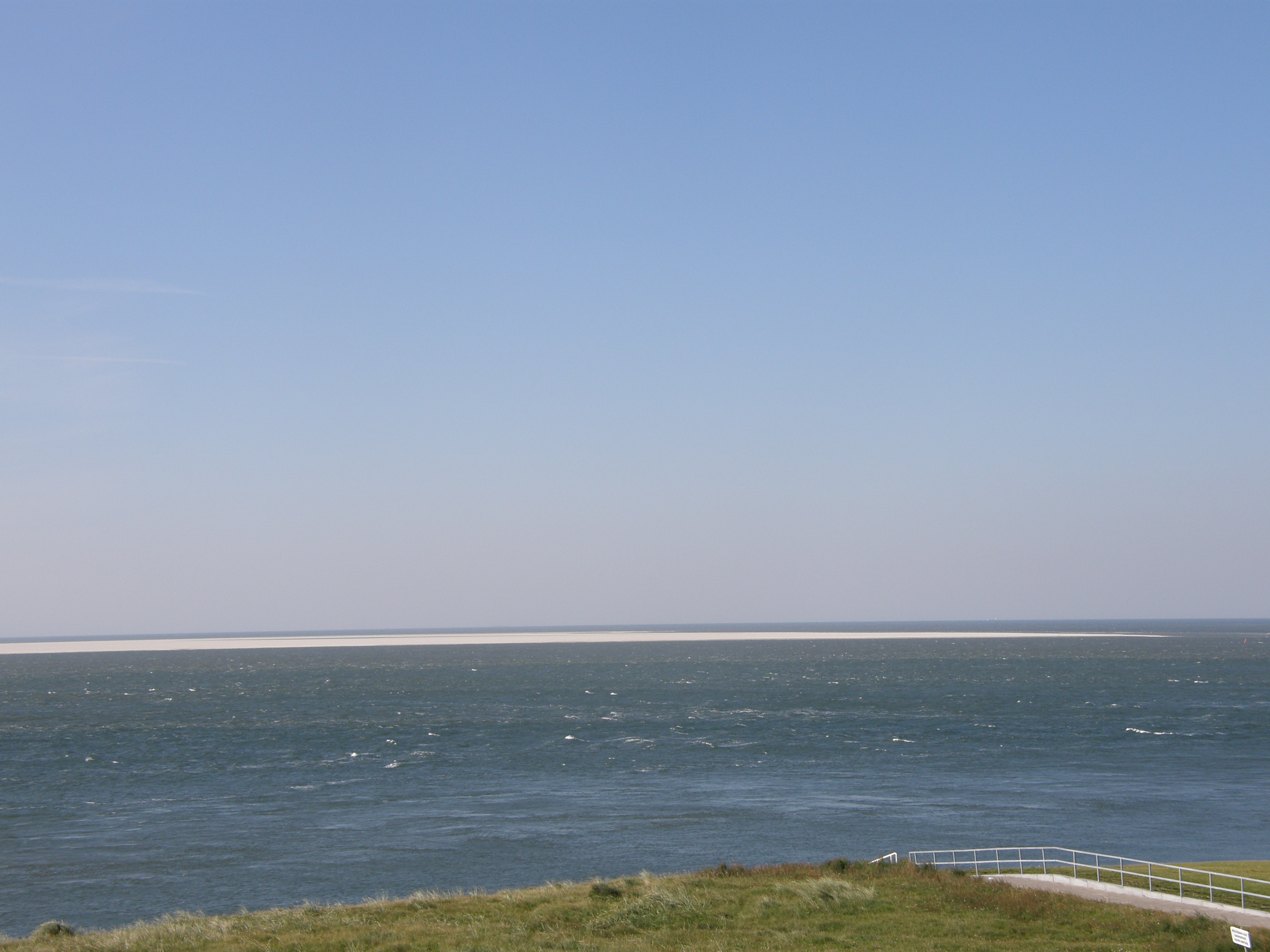
- Noorderhaaks seen from the mainland
- Interactive map of Noorderhaaks

Geography
- Coordinates: 52°58′30″N 4°40′50″E
- Archipelago: (West) Frisian Islands
- Adjacent to: North Sea

Administration
- Netherlands
- Province: North Holland
- Municipality: Texel

Demographics
- Population: Uninhabited

Noorderhaaks (Dutch pronunciation: [ˌnoːrdərˈɦaːks]) is an uninhabited Dutch islet in the North Sea, a few kilometres west of the Marsdiep which separates the island of Texel from the mainland of the Netherlands. The island covers an area of around 5 km^{2} (1.9 sq mi), although the exact area varies due to tide and the dynamic nature of the area. The islet is also called Razende Bol (meaning Raging sandbank in Dutch with bol in this case being an old Dutch word for sandbank).

Being relatively untouched by man, the island has become a valuable location due to its presence of several kinds of seabirds, and seals. The island is visited by day trippers, and is also being used as a training ground for the Royal Netherlands Navy and Air Force.

The island is slowly moving eastward towards the Marsdiep and the Molengat, at a pace of around 100 metres a year. Noorderhaaks is probably the sixth sand bar to develop in the mouth of the Marsdiep, since it formed in the late twelfth century via a flood that occurred in 1170. The previous five have also moved towards Texel and got accreted to the island, with intervals of approximately 150 years each.

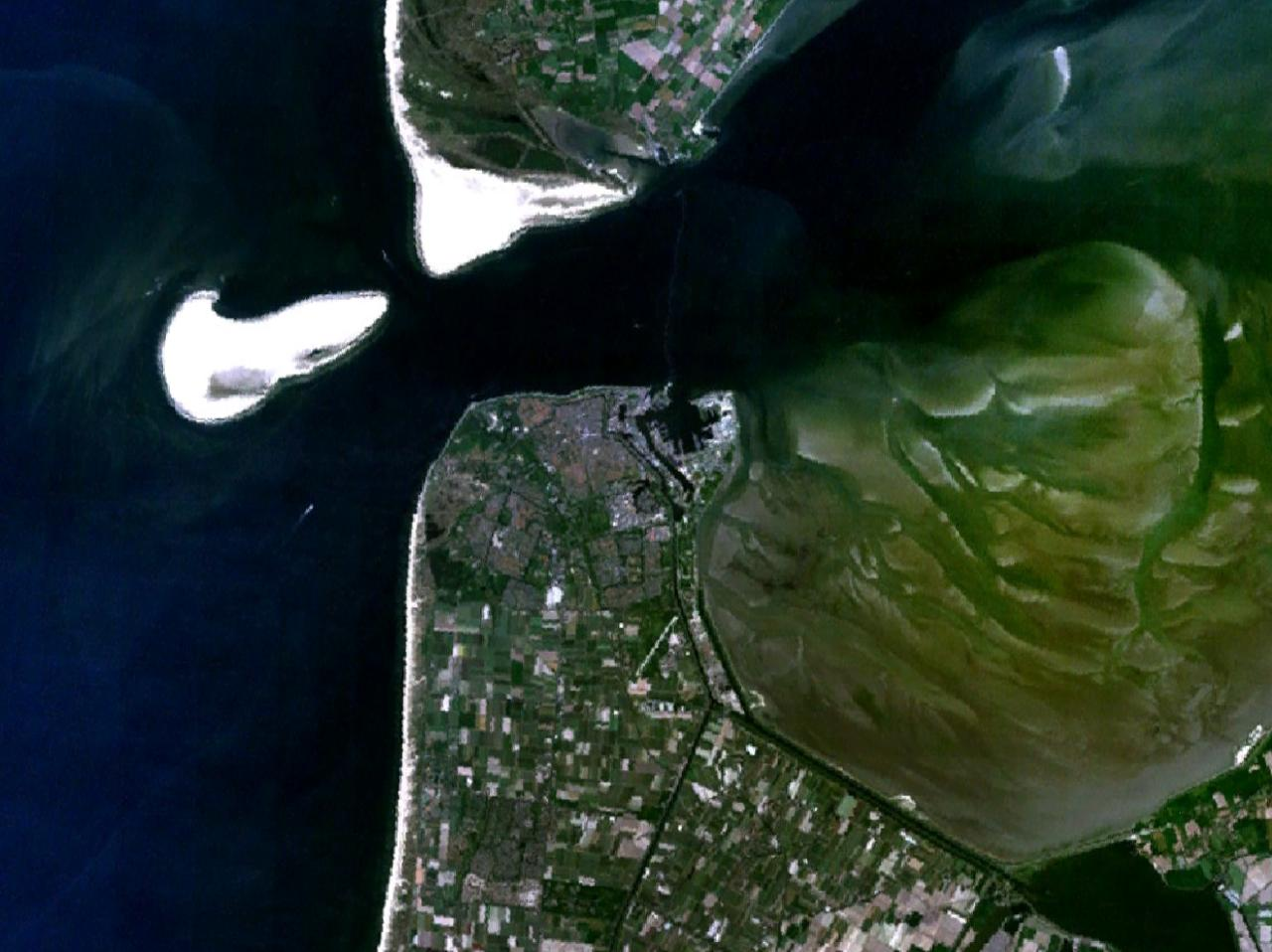
Satellite photo, taken circa 1992

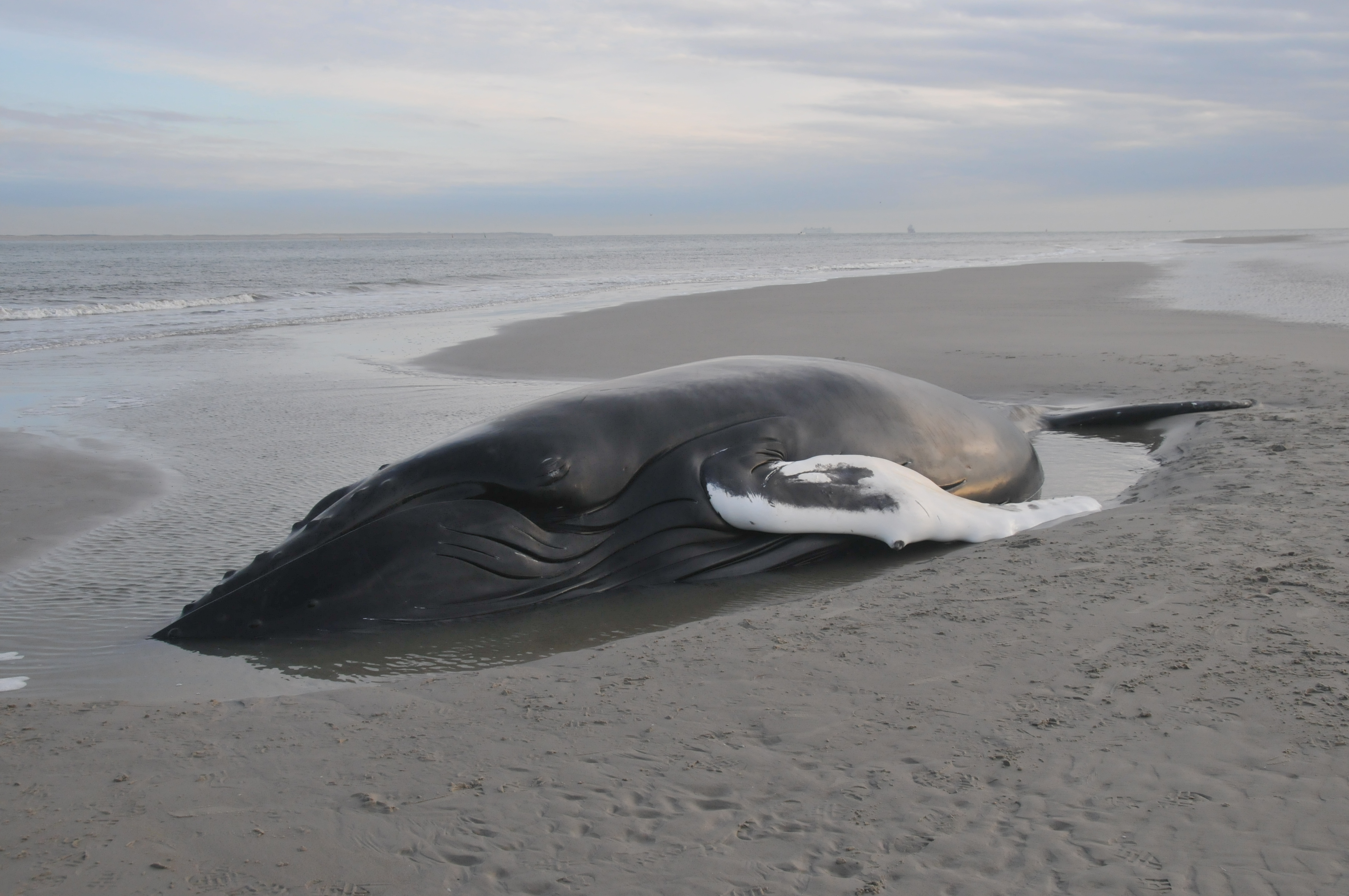
Stranded humpback whale (2012)
