= Griend =

Island in the Netherlands

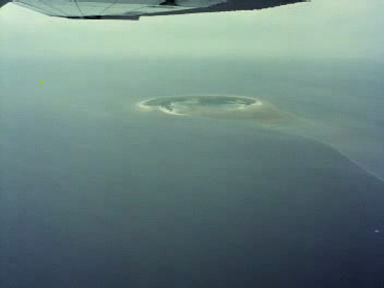
- Griend in 1975
- Interactive map of Griend

Geography
- Coordinates: 53°15′5″N 5°15′15″E
- Archipelago: (West) Frisian Islands
- Adjacent to: North Sea; Wadden Sea

Administration
- Netherlands
- Province: Friesland
- Municipality: Terschelling

Demographics
- Population: Uninhabited

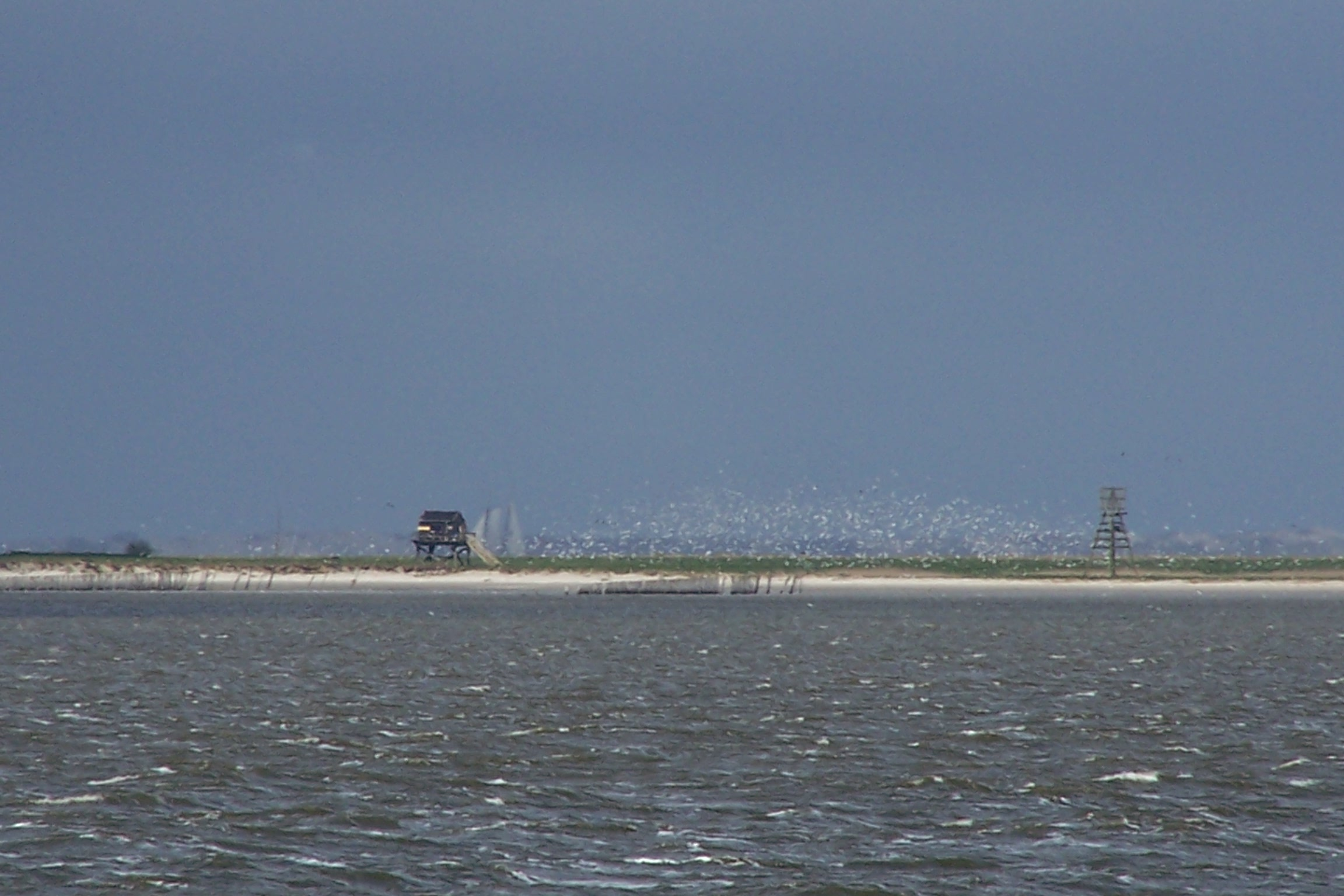
Griend with swarms of birds

Map of Griend

Griend (Dutch pronunciation: [ɣrint]; West Frisian: Gryn) is a small uninhabited Dutch islet in the Wadden Sea, lying around 12 kilometres south of Terschelling. It is one of the West Frisian Islands, and belongs to the municipality of Terschelling. The island currently has an area of around 0.1 km^{2}.

== History ==
In the Middle Ages, the island was inhabited, and on it a walled settlement and a monastery could be found. As a result of continuous erosion of the coast, Griend became smaller over time. In 1287, the settlement was almost completely destroyed as a consequence of St. Lucia's flood. The city was thereafter abandoned and from that time until the eighteenth century, Griend was inhabited by a few farmers, who built their houses on artificial hills. Around 1800, Griend still had an area of 0.25 km^{2}, but the island was moving to the southeast at a speed of 7 metres a year. By that time, all of its inhabitants had abandoned the island, and from then on it was used by inhabitants of Terschelling as a grazing area for sheep, and for the making of hay. The eggs of gulls and terns were also gathered there for consumption.

In 1916, the grazing rights on the island were bought by the Vereniging Natuurmonumenten, a union devoted to the protection of nature, which also tried to prevent the gathering of eggs by guarding the bird colonies on the island. After the Afsluitdijk was completed in 1933, the rate of erosion increased even more. However, the island has survived to the present day, though it is smaller than before, and its current location is to the southeast of what its location was in the Middle Ages.

== Griend now ==
Nowadays, the island is uninhabited, with the exception of a cabin used in summer by birdwatchers and biologists. Griend is not accessible to the general public.

Because Griend is unprotected by dykes, the island is slowly moving eastward. To protect the island and prevent it from vanishing altogether, some measures have been taken: along its southern edge, a few dams have been built, and, around 1990, the island was strengthened by building a low sand dyke along its north side. Since then, the process of erosion has changed into a process of gradual growth.

== Fauna ==
The largest colony of Sandwich terns in Western Europe can be found on Griend: every year, around 10,000 pairs breed on the island. Among others, the common tern, Arctic tern, common eider, common shelduck, Eurasian oystercatcher, common redshank, and occasionally the short-eared owl also breed on the island. During the building of the sand dike, the island was colonized by the wood mouse.

Griend is currently managed by the Vereniging Natuurmonumenten.
