= Engelsmanplaat =

Sandbank off the Netherlands

Coordinates: 53°27′N 6°03′E

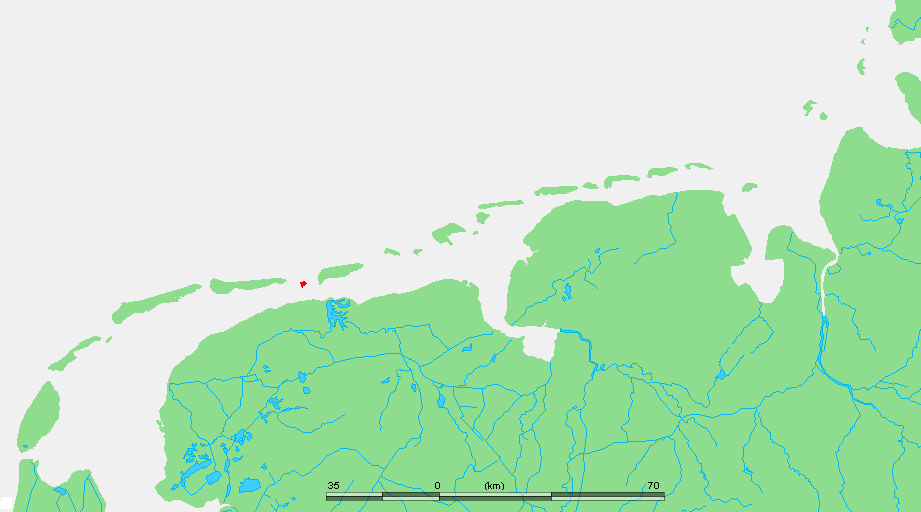
Location of Engelsmanplaat in the Wadden Sea

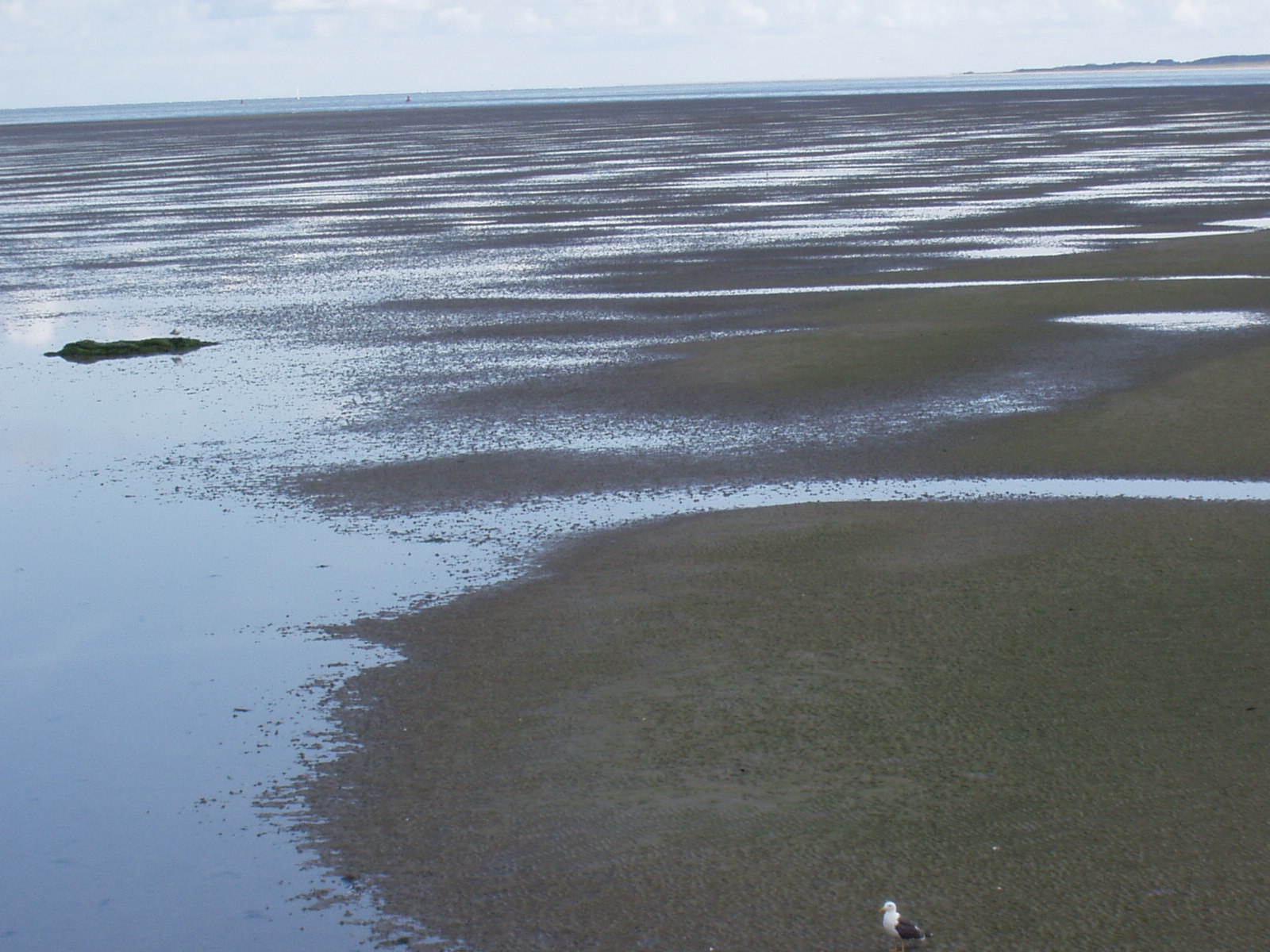
Engelsmanplaat during low tide in 2009

Engelsmanplaat (Dutch pronunciation: [ˈɛŋəlsmɑmˌplaːt]), or De Kalkman which is its local name, is a small sandbank between the Dutch islands Ameland and Schiermonnikoog.
