= 2026–27 Eredivisie =

Eredivisie
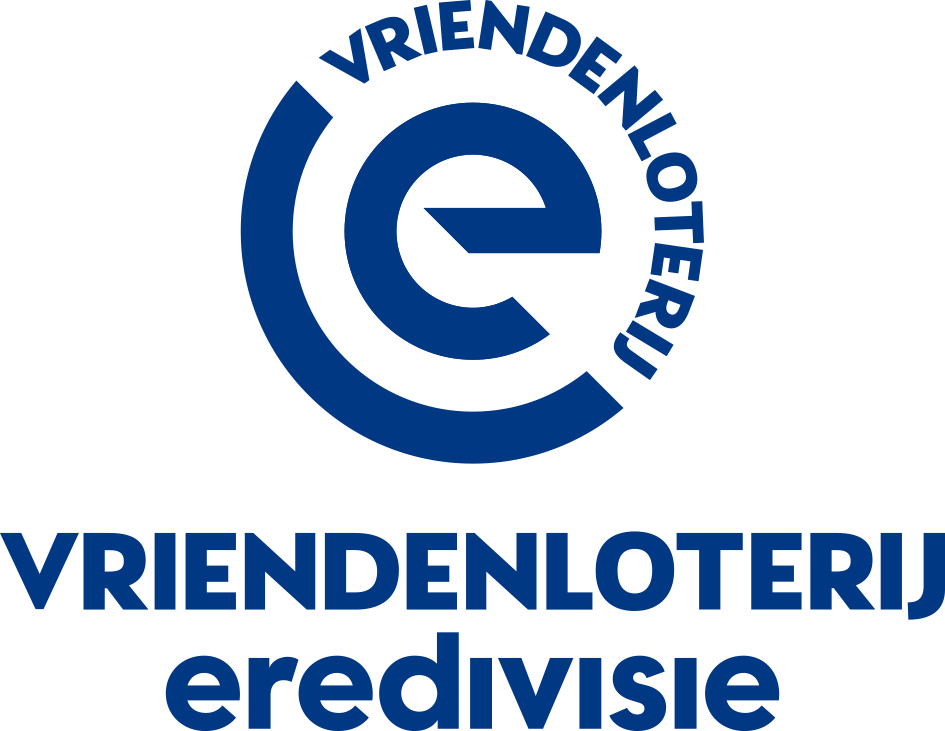
- Season: 2026–27
- Dates: 7 August 2026 – 23 May 2027
- Matches: 113
- Goals: 443 (3.92 per match)
- Top goalscorer: Sven Mijnans; Thom van Bergen; Søren Tengstedt; Wout Weghorst; Brynjólfur Willumsson (9 goals)
- Biggest home win: PSV Eindhoven 7–0 Willem II (31 October 2026)
- Biggest away win: Excelsior 0–9 Twente (1 November 2026)
- Highest scoring: Excelsior 0–9 Twente (1 November 2026)
- Longest winning run: 5 matches PSV Eindhoven; Feyenoord; Heerenveen; AZ
- Longest unbeaten run: 11 matches Feyenoord
- Longest winless run: 12 matches Willem II
- Longest losing run: 6 matches Willem II
- All statistics correct as of 21 November 2026.

The 2026–27 Eredivisie, also known as VriendenLoterij Eredivisie for sponsorship reasons, is the 71st season of Eredivisie, the premier football competition in the Netherlands. The league games are scheduled to be held between 7 August 2026 and 23 May 2027. PSV Eindhoven are the three-time defending champions.

== Teams ==
=== Team changes ===
▲ from 2025–26 Eerste Divisie	▼ to 2026–27 Eerste Divisie
ADO Den Haag (promoted after a five-year absence); Cambuur (promoted after a three-year absence); Willem II (promoted after a one-year absence)	Volendam (relegated after one-year in the top flight); NAC Breda (relegated after two years in the top flight); Heracles Almelo (relegated after three years in the top flight)

Locations of the 2026–27 Eredivisie teams
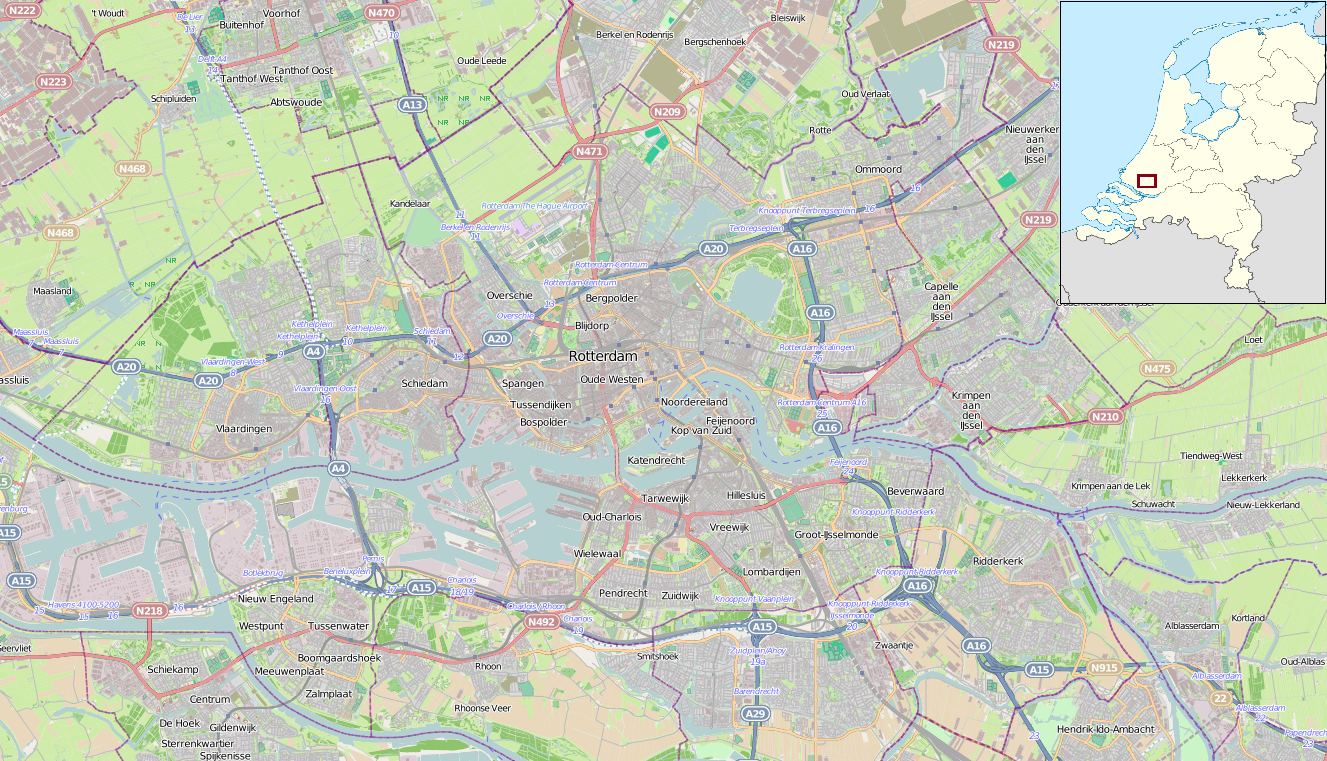
Rotterdam Eredivisie football clubs

=== Stadiums and locations ===
Club	Location	Venue	Capacity	2025–26 position
ADO Den Haag	The Hague	Werktalent Stadion	15,000	1st (Eerste Divisie)
Ajax	Amsterdam	Johan Cruyff Arena	55,865	5th
AZ	Alkmaar	AFAS Stadion	19,478	7th
Cambuur	Leeuwarden	Kooi Stadion	15,000	2nd (Eerste Divisie)
Excelsior	Rotterdam	Van Donge & De Roo Stadion	4,500	13th
Feyenoord	Rotterdam	De Kuip	47,500	2nd
Fortuna Sittard	Sittard	Fortuna Sittard Stadion	12,000	11th
Go Ahead Eagles	Deventer	De Adelaarshorst	10,000	11th
Groningen	Groningen	Euroborg	22,550	9th
Heerenveen	Heerenveen	Abe Lenstra Stadion	26,100	8th
N.E.C.	Nijmegen	Goffertstadion	12,650	3rd
PEC Zwolle	Zwolle	MAC³PARK stadion	14,000	15th
PSV	Eindhoven	Philips Stadion	35,000	1st
Sparta Rotterdam	Rotterdam	Sparta Stadion	11,026	10th
Telstar	Velsen	BUKO Stadion	5,338	14th
Twente	Enschede	De Grolsch Veste	30,205	4th
Utrecht	Utrecht	Stadion Galgenwaard	23,750	6th
Willem II	Tilburg	Koning Willem II Stadion	15,220	3rd (Eerste Divisie)

=== Number of teams by province ===
Number of teams	Province	Team(s)
4	South Holland	ADO Den Haag, Excelsior, Feyenoord, Sparta Rotterdam
3	North Holland	Ajax, AZ, Telstar
3	Overijssel	Twente, Go Ahead Eagles, PEC Zwolle
2	North Brabant	PSV Eindhoven, Willem II
2	Friesland	Cambuur, Heerenveen
1	Gelderland	NEC
1	Groningen	Groningen
1	Limburg	Fortuna Sittard
1	Utrecht	Utrecht

=== Personnel and kits ===
Team	Chairman	Manager	Captain	Kit maker	Shirt sponsor(s)	
Team	Chairman	Manager	Captain	Kit maker	Main	Other(s)
ADO Den Haag	(Netherlands) Natascha van Grinsven-Admiraal	(Netherlands) Levi Schwiebbe (a.i.)	(Finland) Juho Kilo	Erreà	Zelesta	List: Back: Biersteker Bouw, Dak- en Geveltechniek, #ADOgroen; Sleeve: Easy Technical Solutions, Unicomm ICT Services; Shorts: None
Ajax	(Netherlands) Menno Geelen	(Spain) Míchel	(Netherlands) Davy Klaassen	Adidas	Ziggo	List: Back: Olympia; Sleeve: Team Rockstars IT; Shorts: None
AZ	(Netherlands) Merijn Zeeman	(Netherlands) Lee-Roy Echteld	(Netherlands) Jordy Clasie	Nike	AFAS Software	List: Front: AFAS; Back: Leaseweb; Sleeve: Eurojackpot, AdeptView; Shorts: AFAS
Cambuur	(Netherlands) Cees Heijboer	(Netherlands) Johan Plat	(Curaçao) Nicky Souren	Adidas	Bouwgroep Dijkstra Draisma	List: Front: None; Back: TanQyou, Effektief Groep; Sleeve: PAX Groep; Shorts: None
Excelsior	(Netherlands) Bob de Lange	(Netherlands) Ruben den Uil	(Sweden) Casper Widell	Robey	DSW Zorgverzekeraar (YETS Foundation logo on shirt)	List: Front: TJIP; Back: Caru Containers, Seeger Appliances; Sleeve: Caru Containers; Shorts: Caru Containers
Feyenoord	(Netherlands) Robert Eenhoorn	(Netherlands) Giovanni van Bronckhorst	(Netherlands) Luciano Valente	Castore	MediaMarkt	List: Front: None; Back: Prijsvrij; Sleeve: Eurojackpot; Shorts: Fairphone
Fortuna Sittard	(Netherlands) Martijn Merks	(Netherlands) Danny Buijs	(Portugal) Ivo Pinto	Robey	Hurkmans Groep	List: Front: None; Back: None; Sleeve: Winkelhart Sittard; Shorts: Holland Drilling
Go Ahead Eagles	(Netherlands) Jan Willem van Dop	(Netherlands) Joseph Oosting	(Netherlands) Joris Kramer	Stanno	One Click Steel	List: Front: Akkuro; Back: Validsign, Salland Zorgverzekeringen; Sleeve: LoooX (Home) / Easy Drain (Away), Matrix Fitness; Shorts: DGS Processing Solutions, Loodgietersbedrijf M. Kramer Epe
Groningen	(Netherlands) Frank van Mosselveld	(Netherlands) Dick Lukkien	(Netherlands) Thijmen Blokzijl	Robey	Groningen Home of Talent	List: Front: None; Back: U-Sport; Sleeve: Autokan Financial lease; Shorts: None
Heerenveen	(Netherlands) Ferry de Haan	(Netherlands) Robin Veldman	(Netherlands) Luuk Brouwers	Macron	Effektief Groep	List: Front: None; Back: Fieten Olie, Moofpeople Payroll Solutions; Sleeve: None; Shorts: None
NEC	(Netherlands) Wilco van Schaik	(Netherlands) Dick Schreuder	(Suriname) Tjaronn Chery	Robey	Nexperia	List: Front: None; Back: KlokGroep; Sleeve: NasWerkt; Shorts: GX Software
PEC Zwolle	(Netherlands) Joost Broerse	(Netherlands) Alex Pastoor	(New Zealand) Ryan Thomas	Adidas	Zonneplan	List: Front: None; Back: BONFIX, VDK Groep; Sleeve: VDK Groep; Shorts: Herock Workwear
PSV Eindhoven	(Netherlands) Marcel Brands	(Netherlands) Peter Bosz	(Netherlands) Jerdy Schouten	Puma	Metropoolregio Brainport Eindhoven	List: Front: None; Back: GoodHabitz; Sleeve: Eurojackpot, 50+ Mobiel; Shorts: None
Sparta Rotterdam	(Netherlands) Leo Ruijs	(Netherlands) Rogier Meijer	(Netherlands) Bruno Martins Indi	Robey	De Goudse Verzekeringen	List: Front: BICT Groep; Back: Blue10, Van der Helm Logistics; Sleeve: Eurojackpot; Shorts: Trofi Pack
Telstar	(Netherlands) Lex de Jager	(Netherlands) Henk Brugge	(Netherlands) Danny Bakker	Robey	Port of Energy	List: Front: Radio Veronica; Back: BUKO Group, Amsterdam The Style Outlets; Sleeve: MG Bouw, Scotch & Soda; Shorts: CBOX Containers
Twente	(Netherlands) Paul van der Kraan	(Netherlands) John van den Brom	(Netherlands) Robin Pröpper	Castore	GGM Gastro	List: Front: None; Back: D-reizen; Sleeve: Eurojackpot, Looping.com; Shorts: None
Utrecht	(Netherlands) Edo Keuning	(Netherlands) Anthony Correia	(Netherlands) Nick Viergever	Castore	Indeed	List: Front: None; Back: Domogo, Wissel.nl; Sleeve: Jongerius Invest; Shorts: DASSY Workwear
Willem II	(Netherlands) Merijn Goris	(Netherlands) Jurgen Streppel	(Netherlands) Jari Schuurman	Meyba	AVEC Creative	List: Back: Quicargo; Sleeve: Broeren Civil Solutions; Shorts: AVIA Vollenhoven

=== Managerial changes ===
Team	Outgoing manager	Manner of departure	Date of vacancy	Position in table	Replaced by	Date of appointment
Cambuur	(Netherlands) Henk de Jong	Moved to assistant role	24 April 2026	Pre-season	(Netherlands) Johan Plat	1 July 2026
Ajax	(Spain) Óscar García	End of interim spell	17 May 2026	Pre-season	(Spain) Míchel	2 June 2026
Go Ahead Eagles	(Netherlands) Melvin Boel	Sacked	3 June 2026	Pre-season	(Netherlands) Joseph Oosting	11 June 2026
Feyenoord	(Netherlands) Robin van Persie	Sacked	7 June 2026	Pre-season	(Netherlands) Giovanni van Bronckhorst	15 June 2026
Utrecht	(Netherlands) Ron Jans	Retired	30 June 2026	Pre-season	(Netherlands) Anthony Correia	1 July 2026
Telstar	(Netherlands) Anthony Correia	Signed by Utrecht	30 June 2026	Pre-season	(Netherlands) Henk Brugge	1 July 2026
Sparta Rotterdam	(Netherlands) Maurice Steijn	End of contract	30 June 2026	Pre-season	(Netherlands) Rogier Meijer	1 July 2026
PEC Zwolle	(Netherlands) Henry van der Vegt	Sacked	13 October 2026	16th	(Netherlands) Dennis van der Ree (a.i.) and (Netherlands) Maikel van der Werff (a.i.)	16 October 2026
Willem II	(Netherlands) John Stegeman	Sacked	20 October 2026	18th	(Netherlands) Adrie Koster (a.i.)	21 October 2026
Willem II	(Netherlands) Adrie Koster	End of interim spell	28 October 2026	18th	(Netherlands) Jurgen Streppel	28 October 2026
ADO Den Haag	(Germany) Robin Peter	Sacked	2 November 2026	17th	(Netherlands) Levi Schwiebbe (a.i.)	2 November 2026
PEC Zwolle	(Netherlands) Dennis van der Ree (a.i.) and (Netherlands) Maikel van der Werff (a.i.)	End of interim spell	7 November 2026	13th	(Netherlands) Alex Pastoor	7 November 2026

== League table ==
Pos	Team	Pld	W	D	L	GF	GA	GD	Pts	Qualification or relegation
1	PSV Eindhoven	13	9	2	2	44	16	+28	29	Qualification for the Champions League league phase
2	Ajax	13	8	4	1	35	15	+20	28	Qualification for the Champions League third qualifying round
3	Twente	13	8	3	2	32	13	+19	27	Qualification for the Europa League second qualifying round
4	AZ	13	8	2	3	29	17	+12	26	Qualification for the European competition play-offs
5	Feyenoord	13	7	4	2	38	20	+18	25	Qualification for the European competition play-offs
6	Heerenveen	13	7	3	3	27	17	+10	24	Qualification for the European competition play-offs
7	Fortuna Sittard	13	6	5	2	21	20	+1	23	Qualification for the European competition play-offs
8	Cambuur	13	5	3	5	28	29	−1	18	
9	Go Ahead Eagles	13	4	5	4	24	28	−4	17	
10	Groningen	13	4	3	6	30	31	−1	15	
11	PEC Zwolle	13	4	3	6	16	25	−9	15	
12	NEC	13	3	5	5	21	25	−4	14	
13	Excelsior	13	4	2	7	19	31	−12	14	
14	Sparta Rotterdam	13	3	3	7	22	34	−12	12	
15	Utrecht	13	3	3	7	23	37	−14	12	
16	Telstar	13	2	4	7	19	28	−9	10	Qualification for the Relegation play-off
17	ADO Den Haag	13	2	3	8	16	28	−12	9	Relegation to Eerste Divisie
18	Willem II	13	0	3	10	12	42	−30	3	Relegation to Eerste Divisie

Updated to match(es) played on 22 November 2026. Source: Eredivisie
Rules for classification: 1) Points; 2) Less loss points; 3) Goal difference; 4) Goals scored; 5) Head-to-head points; 6) Head-to-head goal difference; 7) Head-to-head away goals scored; 9) Play-off if relevant for deciding champion, relegation or participating in a European league, otherwise by draw. 9) Penalty shoot-out (only after a play-off)

== Results ==
Home \ Away	ADO	AJA	AZ	CAM	EXC	FEY	FOR	GAE	GRO	HEE	NEC	PEC	PSV	SPA	TEL	TWE	UTR	WIL
ADO Den Haag				1–1	6 Dec		2–3	30 Jan	1–4	2–3		16 Jan	2–1	3–1	10 Jan		29 Nov	
Ajax	3–0		1–0	13 Dec	2–2	a			17 Jan	2–2	1–1		1–3		23 Jan		6 Dec	5–1
AZ	2–0					31 Jan		5–2	4–3	9 Jan	13 Dec		5 Dec		1–0	0–2	24 Jan	1–1
Cambuur			2–2		0–4	2–5		4–0	20 Dec		3–0		2–5	28 Nov		1–4		17 Jan
Excelsior			19 Dec			16 Jan	22 Jan	0–1	1–5				1–2	2–1	28 Nov	0–9	1–2	
Feyenoord	2–2	29 Nov	2–0		2–3		1–1	2–2				23 Jan	10 Jan	a		20 Dec	5–0	
Fortuna Sittard		1–5	0–2	3–1	1–0					29 Nov		5 Dec	16 Jan	19 Dec	2–2	1–1		
Go Ahead Eagles	3–1	20 Dec	17 Jan	24 Jan			0–1		1–1			a		3–3	3–2	6 Dec		4–1
Groningen		2–5				13 Dec	2–3	10 Jan		1–3	31 Jan	3–0		2–3		2–2	2–1	27 Nov
Heerenveen		31 Jan	2–3	6 Dec	4–0	5–3		12 Dec	a		1–0	0–2		15 Jan	0–0	1–0		
NEC	20 Dec			10 Jan	2–2	1–3	2–2	1–1	2–2				1–4		1–2	29 Nov		24 Jan
PEC Zwolle	1–0	0–2	29 Nov	0–1	12 Dec	0–7	30 Jan	4–1			1–3						9 Jan	
PSV Eindhoven	23 Jan	a				1–1	2–2	28 Nov	5–1	2–0		20 Dec		4–1	13 Dec			7–0
Sparta Rotterdam		1–2	1–5		9 Jan	0–1			24 Jan	0–4	5 Dec	2–2			30 Jan		3–3	3–2
Telstar	2–2	0–4		2–2		3–4			4 Dec		16 Jan	1–3		1–3			4–2	18 Dec
Twente	2–0	2–2		31 Jan			8 Jan			23 Jan		3–1	3–2	13 Dec	1–0		1–2	2–1
Utrecht			1–4	2–3	29 Jan		12 Dec	3–3		19 Dec	2–3	1–1	1–6			17 Jan		3–1
Willem II	13 Dec	9 Jan		1–6	0–3	5 Dec	0–1			2–2	1–4	1–1	30 Jan					

Updated to match(es) played on 22 November 2026. Source: Flashscore
Legend: Blue = home team win; Yellow = draw; Red = away team win.
For upcoming matches, an "a" indicates there is an article about the rivalry between the two participants.

== Season statistics ==
=== Top scorers ===
Rank	Player	Club	Goals
1	(Netherlands) Sven Mijnans	PSV Eindhoven	9
1	(Netherlands) Thom van Bergen	Groningen	9
1	(Denmark) Søren Tengstedt	Go Ahead Eagles	9
1	(Netherlands) Wout Weghorst	Twente	9
1	(Iceland) Brynjólfur Willumsson	Groningen	9
6	(Spain) Nacho Ferri	Feyenoord	7
6	(Algeria) Anis Hadj Moussa	Feyenoord	7
6	(Netherlands) Guus Til	PSV Eindhoven	7
6	(Netherlands) Milan Zonneveld	Sparta Rotterdam	7
6	(Nigeria) Tolu Arokodare	Ajax	7

=== Hat-tricks ===
Rnd	Player	Club	Goals	Date	Home	Score	Away
6	(Spain) Nacho Ferri	Feyenoord	18', 23', 49'	13 September 2026	PEC Zwolle	0–7	Feyenoord
6	(Netherlands) Sven Mijnans	PSV Eindhoven	23', 74', 88'	13 September 2026	PSV Eindhoven	4–1	Sparta Rotterdam
11	(Netherlands) Wout Weghorst^{4}	Twente	12', 32', 33', 62' (p)	1 November 2026	Excelsior	0–9	Twente
12	(Netherlands) Ringo Meerveld	Heerenveen	61', 84', 90+3'	8 November 2026	Heerenveen	5–3	Feyenoord
12	(Netherlands) Sven Mijnans	PSV Eindhoven	1', 15', 80'	8 November 2026	Cambuur	2–5	PSV Eindhoven

Notes

^{4} Player scored 4 goals

== Awards ==
=== Monthly awards ===
Month	Player of the Month		Talent of the Month		Manager of the Month		Ref.
Month	Player	Club	Player	Club	Manager	Club	Ref.
August	(Netherlands) Gjivai Zechiël	Feyenoord	(Belgium) Noah Fernandez	PSV Eindhoven	(Netherlands) Lee-Roy Echteld	AZ	
September	(Algeria) Anis Hadj Moussa	Feyenoord	(Netherlands) Givairo Read	Feyenoord	(Netherlands) Giovanni van Bronckhorst	Feyenoord	
October	(Netherlands) Tyrone Owusu	Telstar	(Netherlands) Ruud Nijstad	Twente	(Netherlands) Johan Plat	Cambuur	
