= Amsterdam IJ Ferries =

Overview of GVB ferries in Amsterdam

The Amsterdam Ferries, run by GVB, consist of several lines over the IJ and the Amsterdam–Rhine Canal in the Netherlands. The lines are numbered F1 through F9. All of the services are free for pedestrians, bicycles, mopeds, scooters and wheelchair-accessible vehicles.

There are also three ferry connections over the Noordzeekanaal that are also accessible for cars but for a fee. The current line numbers F1 through F9 and F20 through F22 are in use since January 3, 2021, before that date GVB used the line numbers 900–915.

== Current service ==
=== F1 - Oostveer ===
The F1 line started on March 15, 2014, as a one-year test for the connection between Azartplein in the Oostelijk Havengebied and the east end of the Johan van Hasseltweg. The ferry sails daily every 20 minutes from 6:30 a.m. to 10:30 p.m. This line was 915 until 2021.

=== F2 - IJpleinveer ===
The IJpleinveer (line F2), originally called the Adelaarsweg ferry or the Valkenweg ferry, from De Ruijterkade to the Meeuwenlaan in IJplein. The F2 sails every quarte hour and every 7.5 minutes during rush hour. This line was 02 until 2021. Currently the ferry departs from the jetty at the Ooster Access, near Bridge 276. This jetty is in use from February 2022. This has greatly reduced the distance across the IJ, making the sailing time shorter and the frequency higher. Up to ten trips per hour can now be made (six-minute service).

When the ferry employees strike or the IJ ferries cannot sail due to heavy ice, one of the tubes of the IJ tunnel is cleared for pedestrians and cyclists, to guarantee the connection with Amsterdam-Noord.

=== F3 - Buiksloterwegveer ===
The Buiksloterwegveer (line F3), also known as de Tolhuis ferry, sails from the Centraal Station to the Buiksloterweg . During the day hours there are 2 ferries in operation that cross in tandem every 6 minutes. After 21:00, only one ferry is used, which leaves each side every 12 minutes.

Starting on July 7, 2014, a third ferry was added during rush hour, allowing the frequency to be improved to every 4 minutes. The necessary ferry was withdrawn from the Distelwegveer during peak hours on which a larger ferry was deployed instead. The third ferry operated on a trial basis until November 2014 but returned from March 30, 2015, due to the large number of cyclists. The ferry has been in service ever since, except for a few weeks around and after New Year's Eve when planned maintenance takes place on the ferries so that one ferry less is available. When it is very busy, four ferries can also be used. This line was 907 until 2021.

=== F4 - NDSM-werfveer ===
The NDSM-werfveer (Line F4) sails from the Centraal Station to the NDSM area. This ferry was established around 2002 when new facilities were opened at the shipyard site. It sails every fifteen minutes during busy times and every thirty minutes outside of busy times. During the weekend the ferry runs every ten minutes during the day. Since January 1, 2024, this ferry has been sailing every night until 2:00 AM, and even until 3:30 AM on Friday and Saturday nights. This line was 906 until 2021.

=== F5 - Nachtelijk Westveer ===
The Nightly west ferry (F5) operates differently than the other ferries. This line only sails at night and connects 3 points (unlike the others that connect 2 points). The ferry has a low frequency of once every 45 minutes, sailing until 2-3 AM. This line was 905 until 2021.

=== F6 - Distelwegveer ===
The Distelweg ferry (line F6) sails between the Pontsteiger at Tasmanstraat (Oude Houthaven), temporarily Westerdoksdijk from April 6, 2015, to June 17, 2018, and the Distelweg. It operates Monday to Friday from 6:30 AM to 7:30 PM. It sails four times an hour.

This line was 900 until 2021.

=== F7 - Houthavenveer ===
The Houthaven ferry (line F7) was established on April 2, 2007, connecting the Pontsteiger at Tasmanstraat (this was temporarily changed to Westerdoksdijk from April 6, 2015, to June 17, 2018) and the NDSM area in Amsterdam-Noord. The ferry sails every twenty minutes from Monday to Friday, 6:30 AM to 7:30 PM and since April 11, 2008 also in the evenings and on weekends. Since 2014, this route has been served on weekend nights by the Nachtelijk Westveer (line F5).

=== F9 - Sporenburg - Zeeburgereiland ===
The F9 ferry was established on January 9, 2023, sailing every twenty minutes from Monday to Friday across the Amsterdam–Rhine Canal between the Ertskade on the island of Sporenburg and the Zeeburgereiland, where the new Sluisbuurt neighborhood is being built. The connection was established because the number of residents on Zeeburgereiland is set to grow significantly, from about 10,000 in 2020 to 30,000 in 2038. There is a plan to build a pedestrian and cyclist bridge in the future, but some Sporenburg residents are against this as the infrastructure on Sporenburg would not be able to handle the large number of cyclists.

== Gallery ==
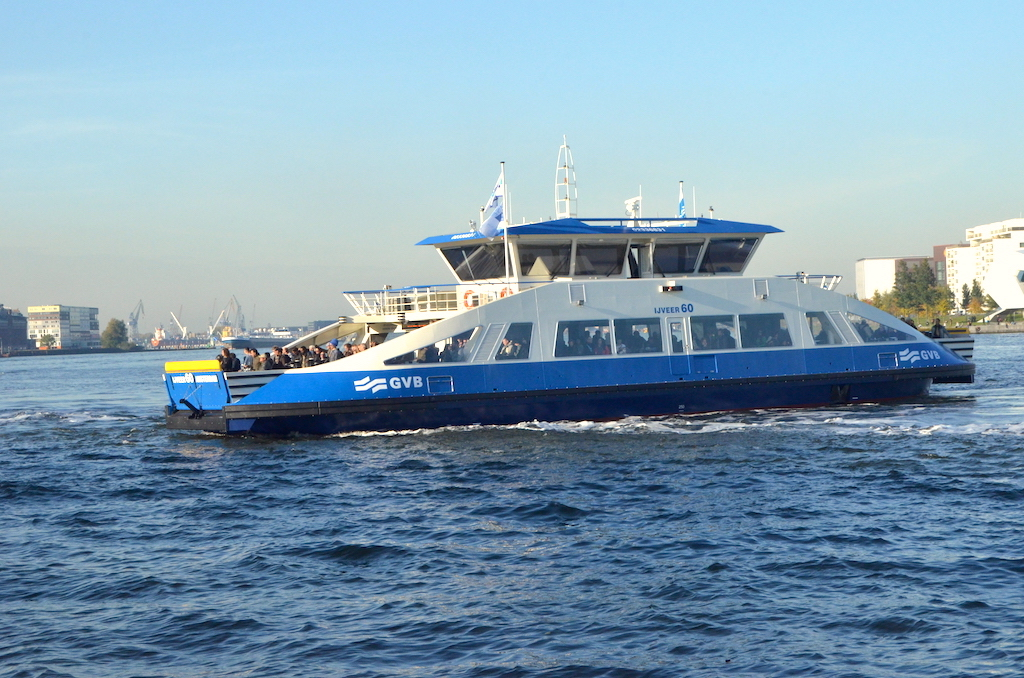
IJ ferry 60, the first of the 60s series: sailing to Buiksloterwegveer.

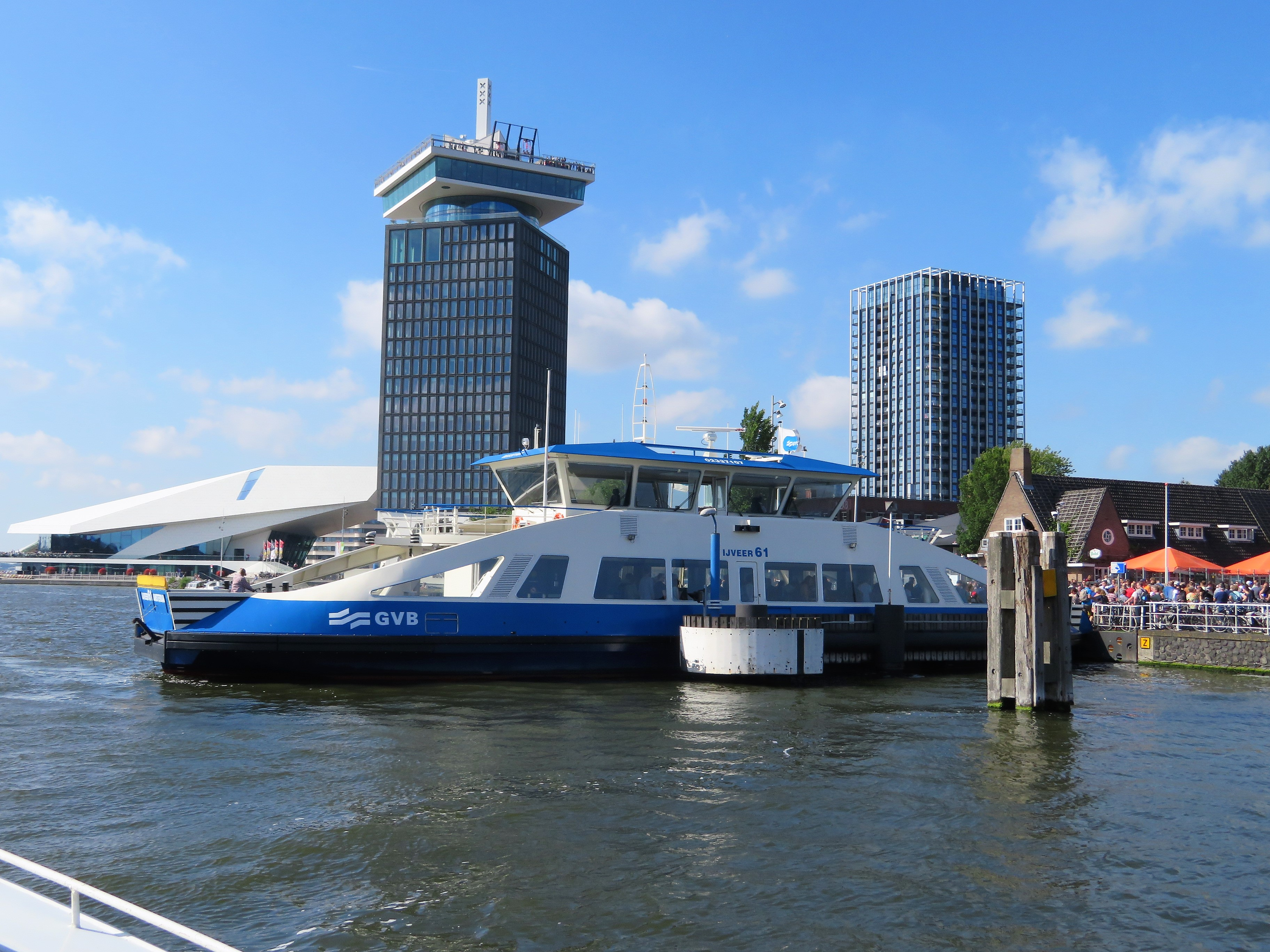
IJ ferry 61 in front of the A'DAM Toren en het Eye Filmmuseum.

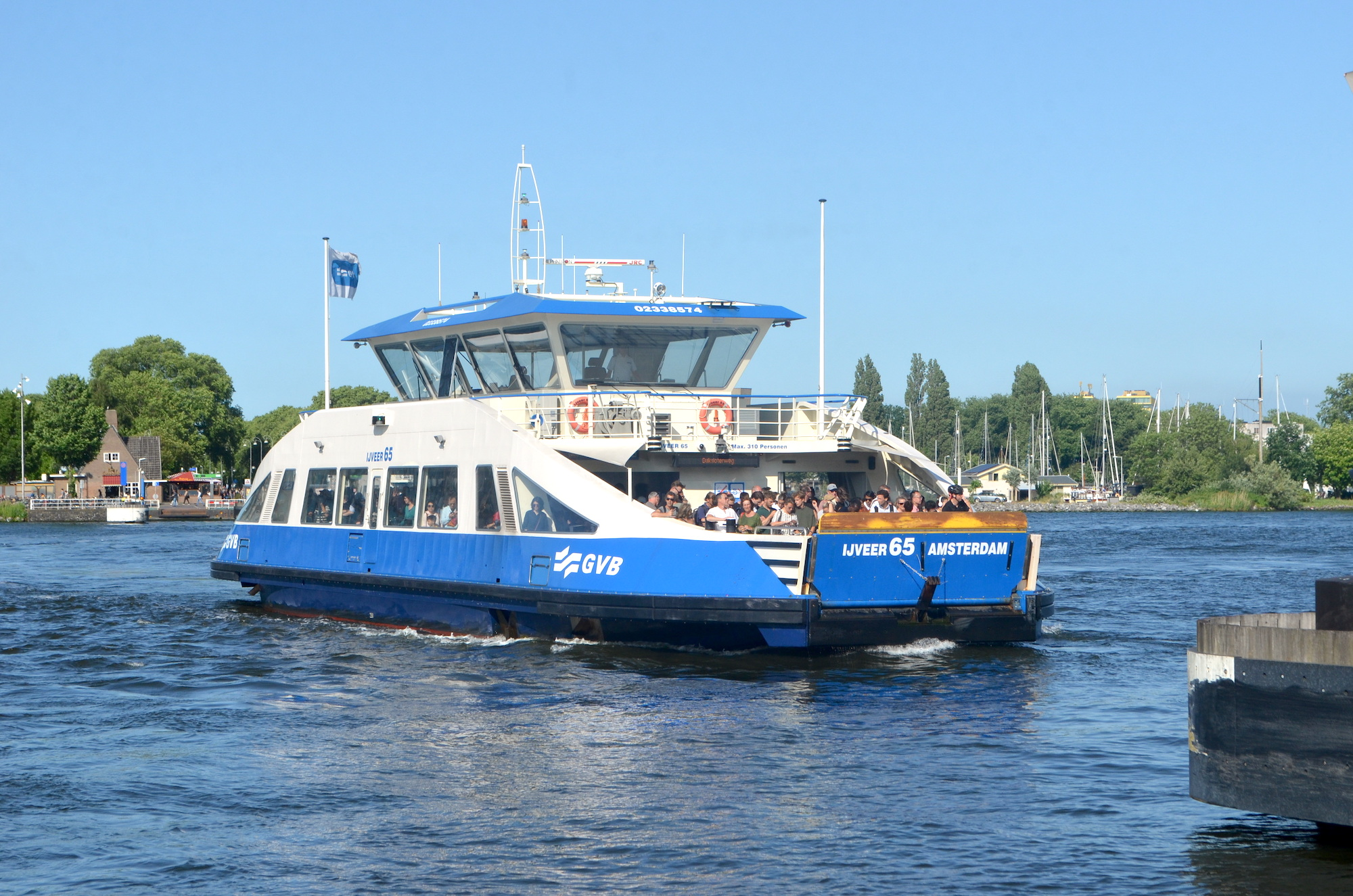
IJ ferry 65 on the IJ 21 June, 2023.

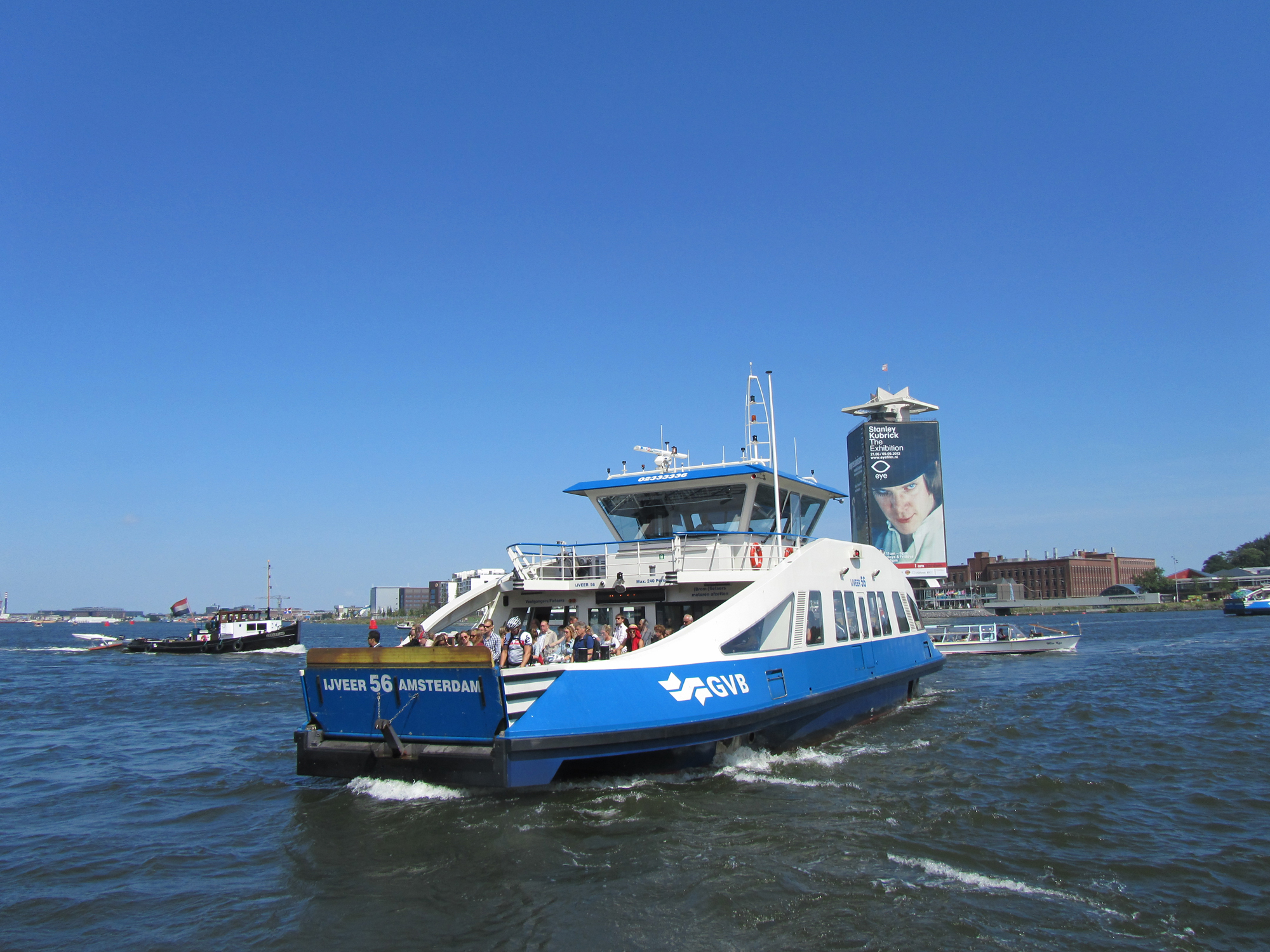
IJ ferry 56 between the Centraal Station and the IJplein.

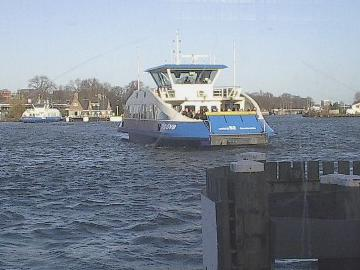
Ferry seen from De Ruijterkade.

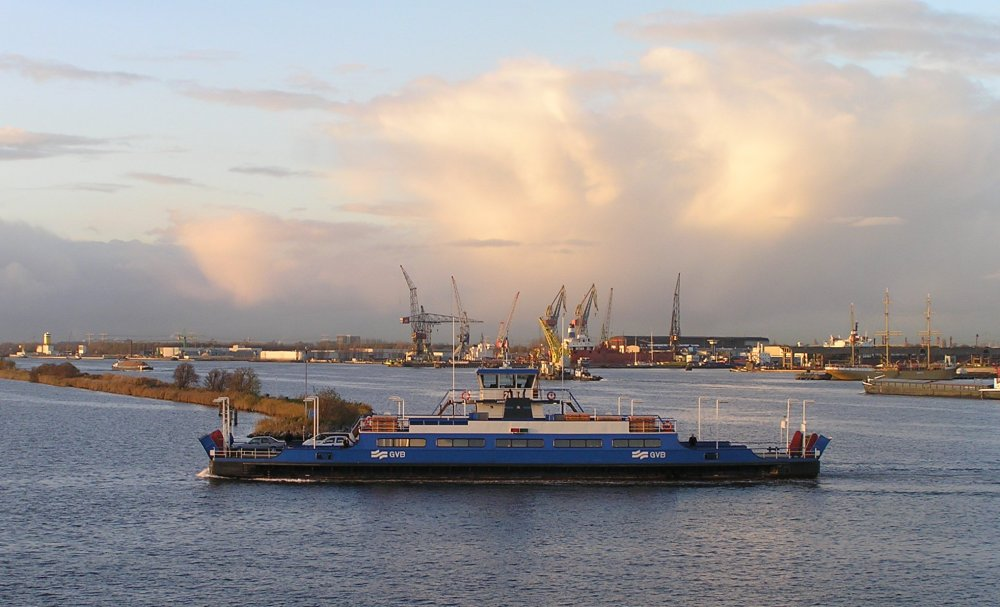
Distelwegveer

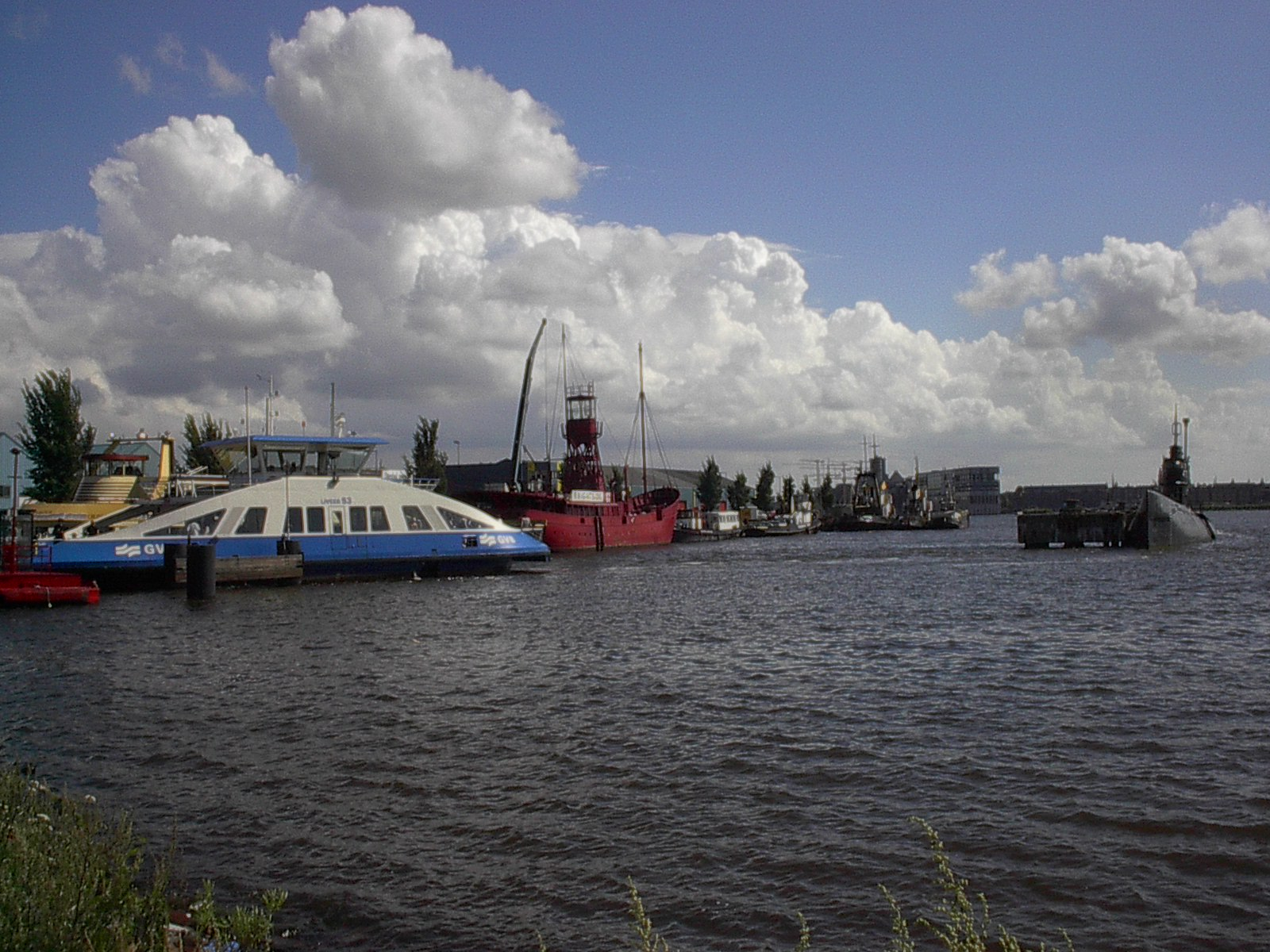
Houthavenveer

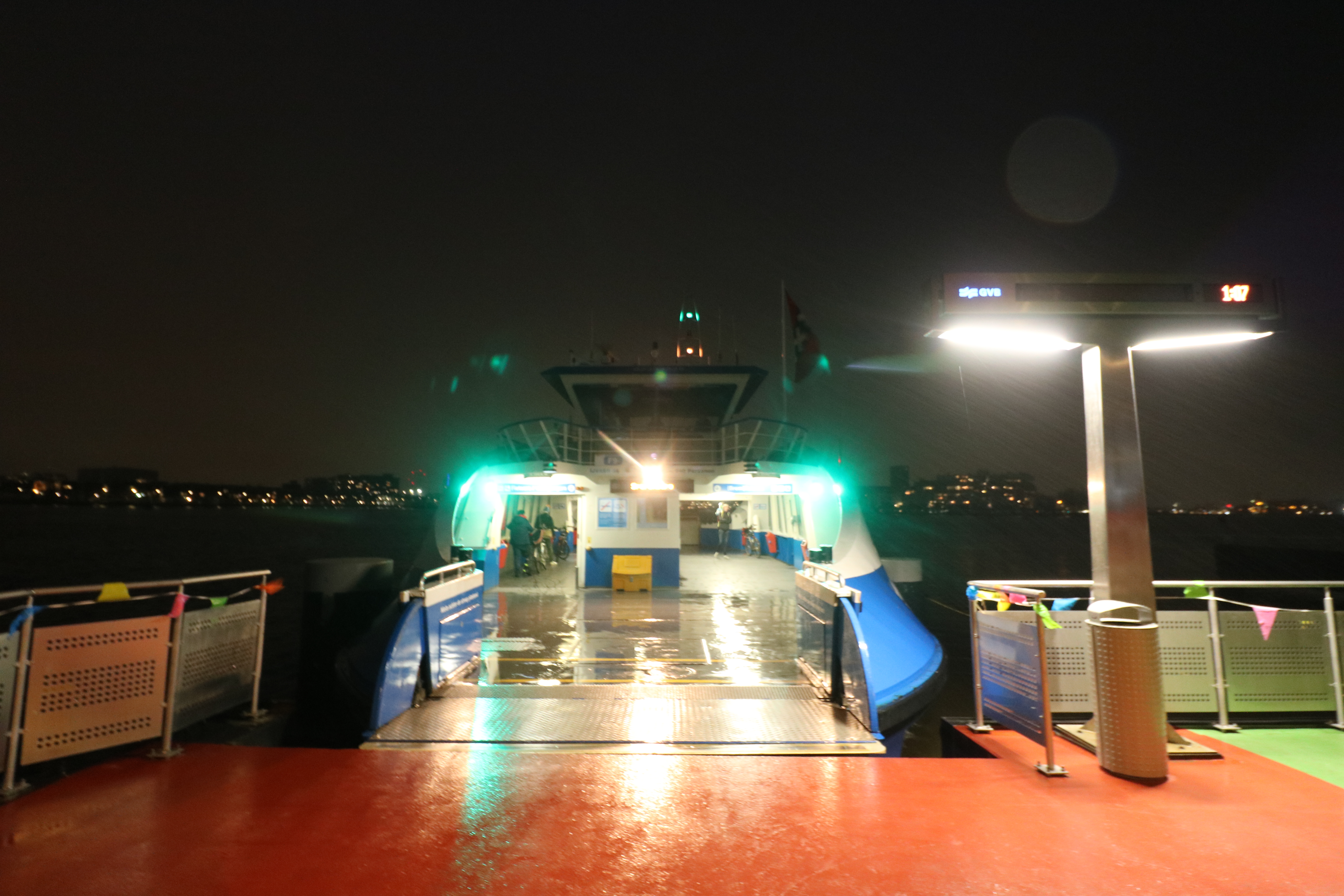
The boat from the Sporenburg on the first sail date, 9 January 2023.

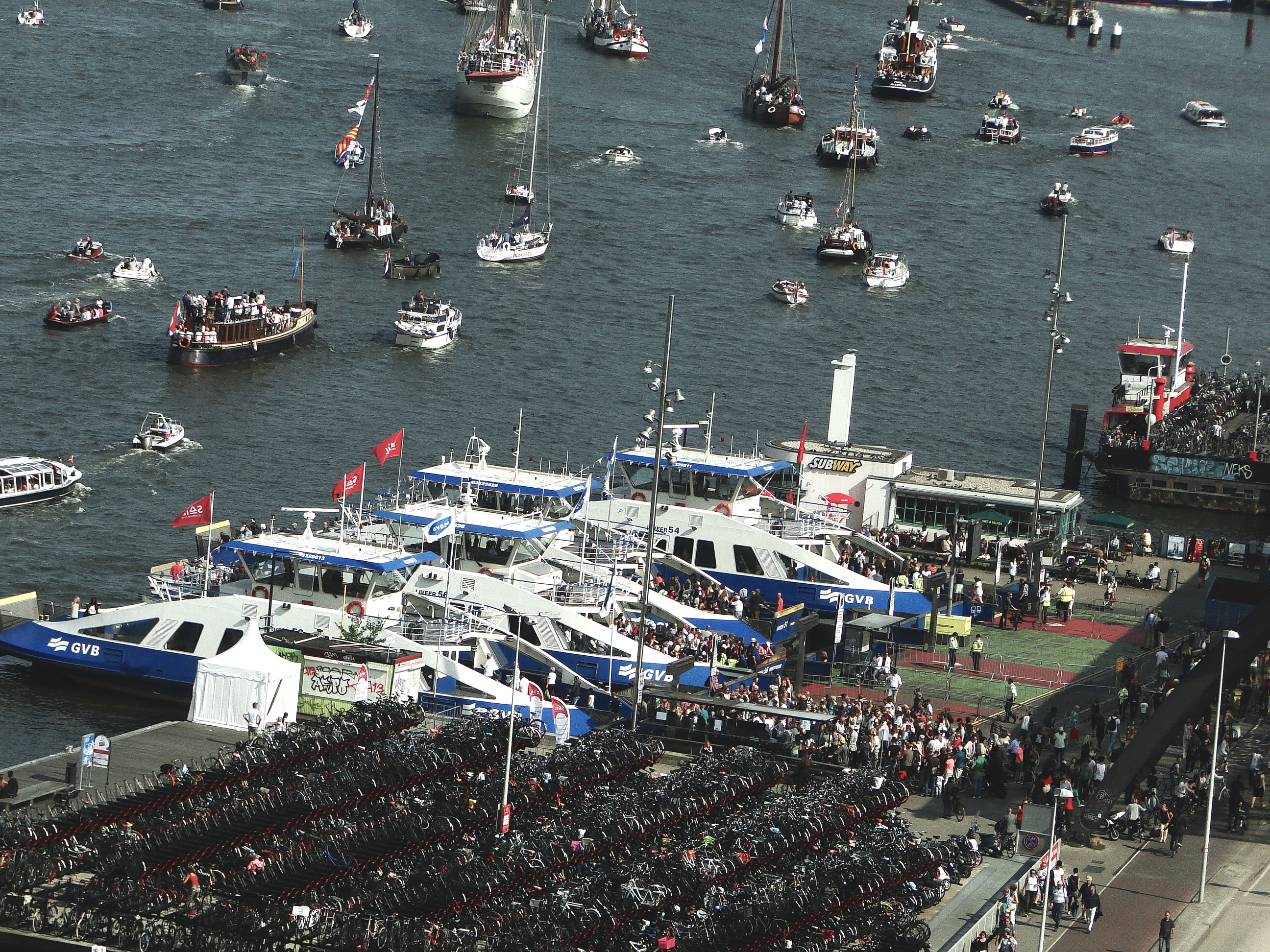
4 ferries moored at the Amsterdam Central Station. In the background on the right is an old ferry, then used as a bicycle shed. August 2015.

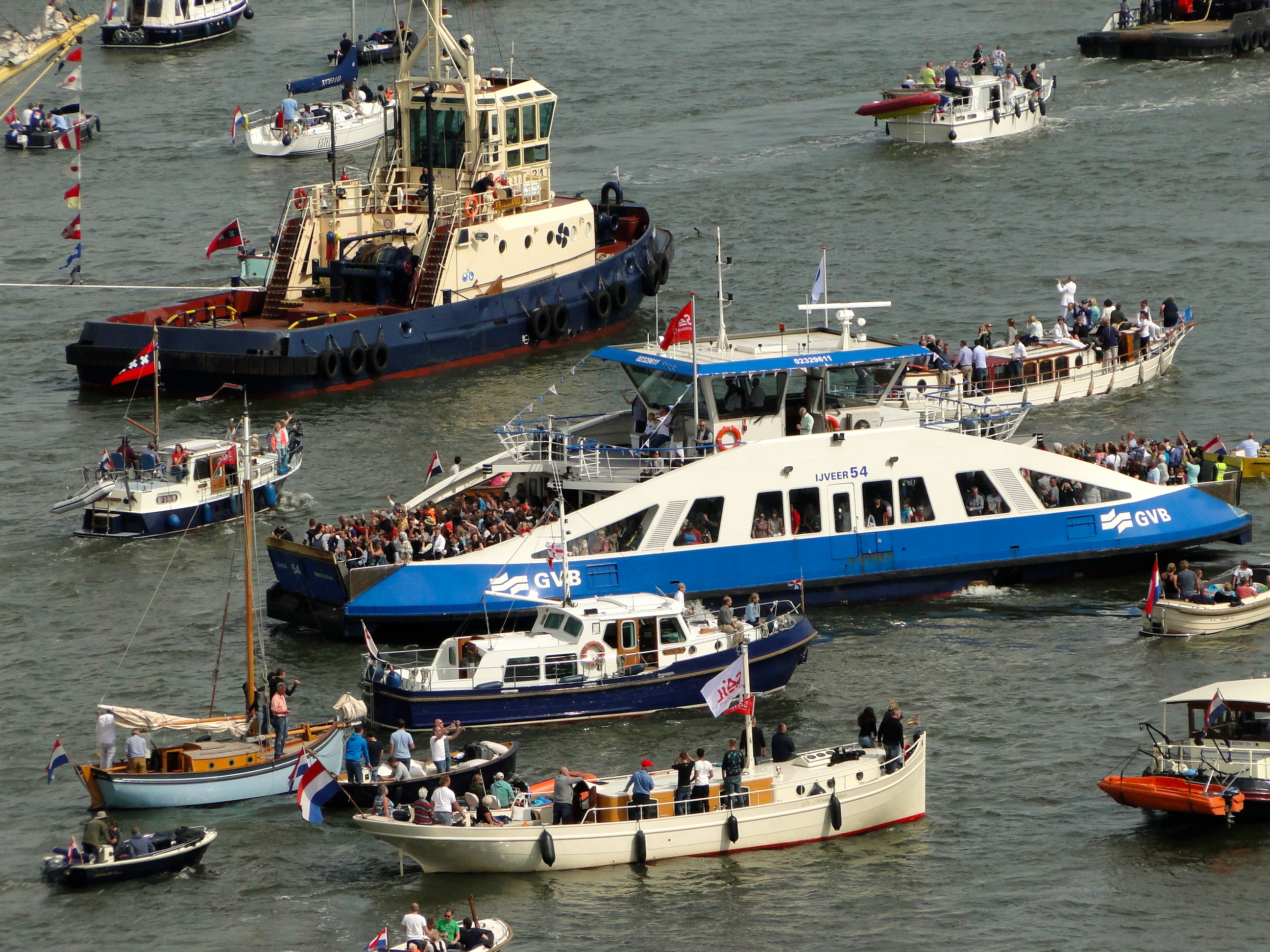
IJ ferry 54 in busy waters during Sail Amsterdam 2015.

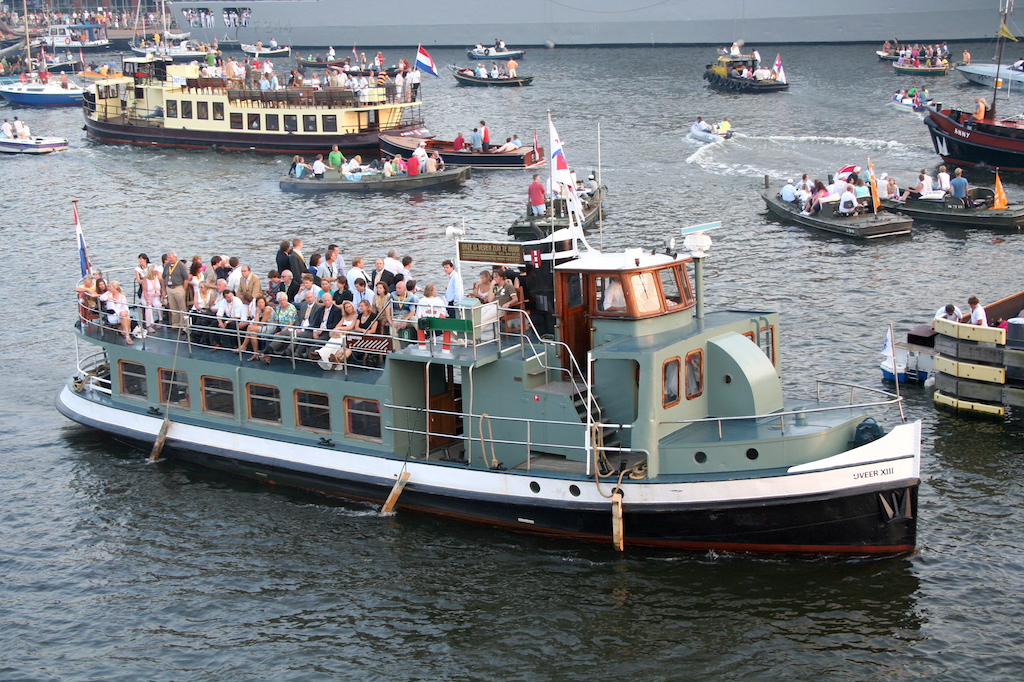
IJ ferry XIII on a cruise during Sail Amsterdam 2005. In the background, IJ ferry XI.

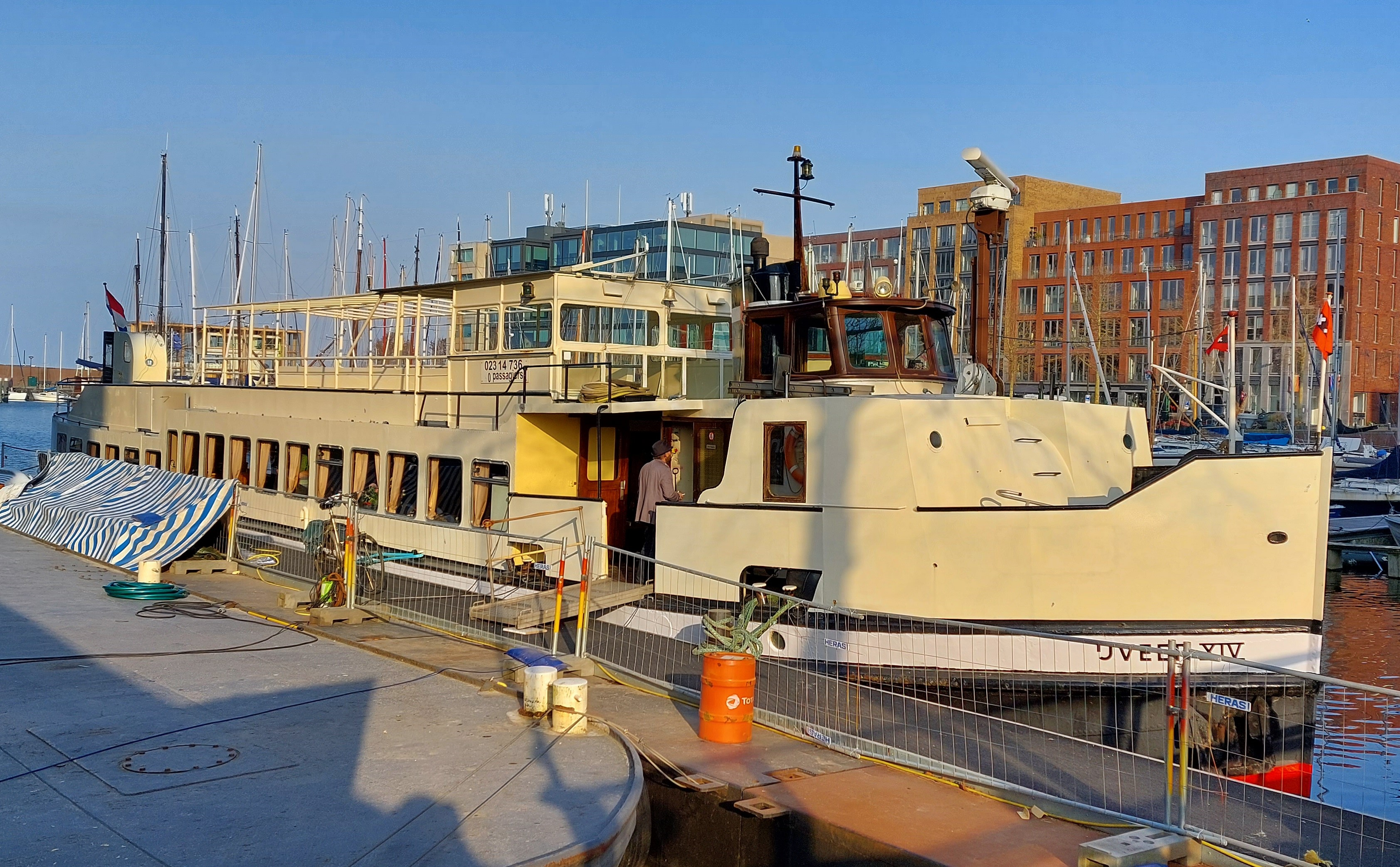
IJ ferry XIV in the port of IJburg in 2022.

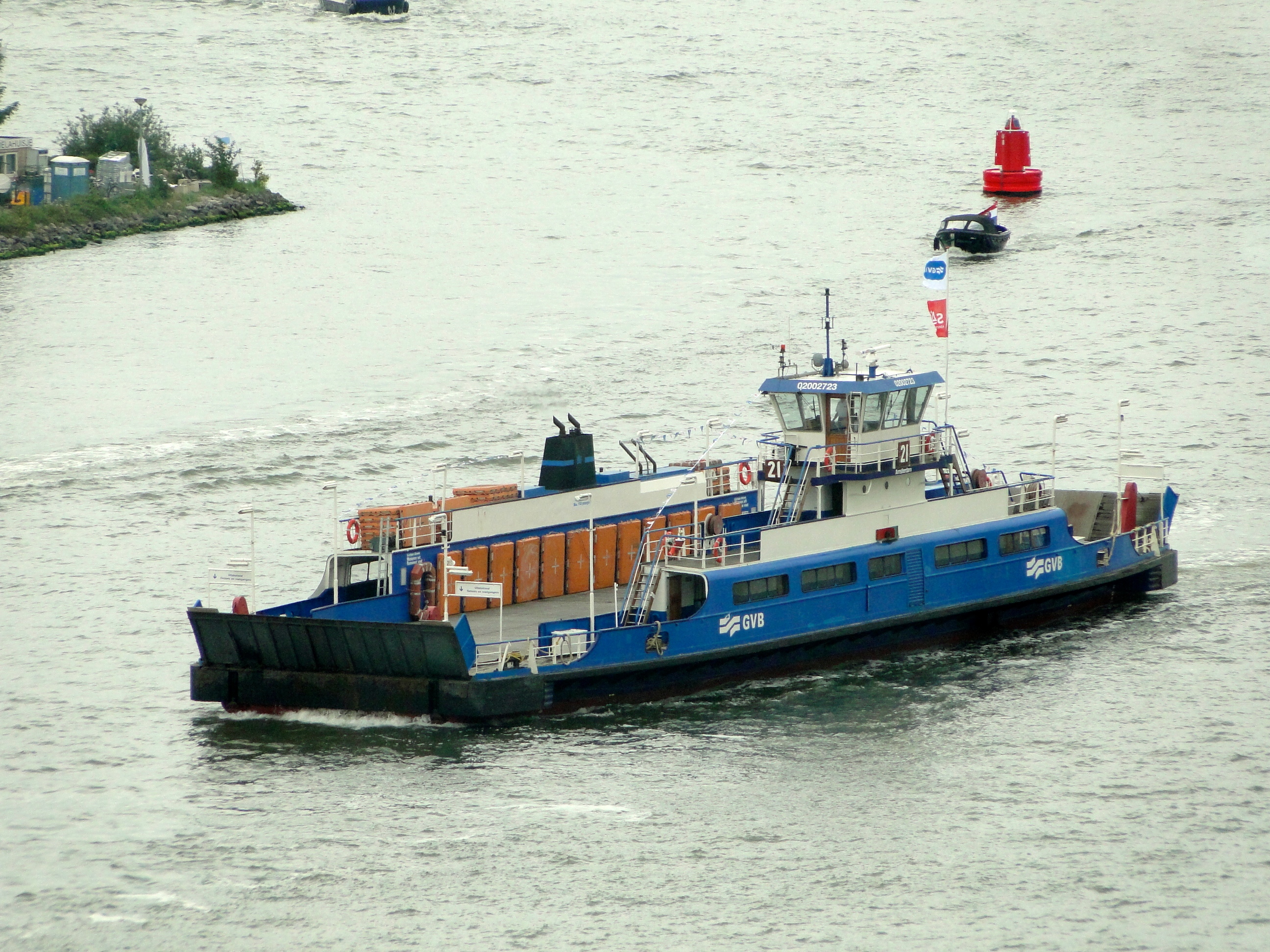
Ferry 21 on the IJ.

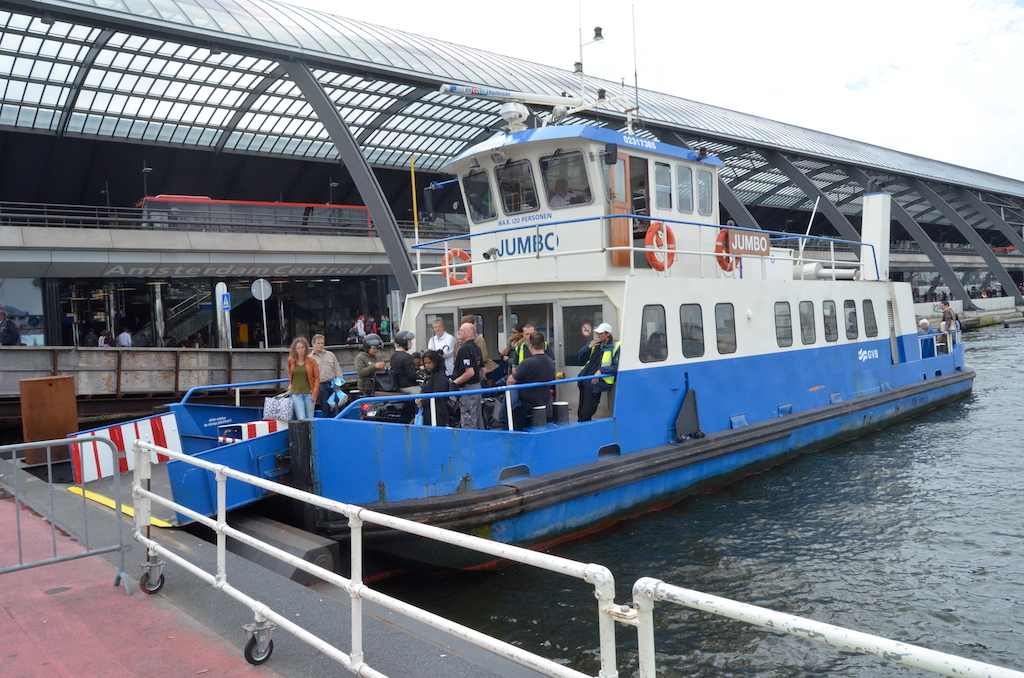
IJ ferry Jumbo (ex-32) at De Ruijterkade, 2016.

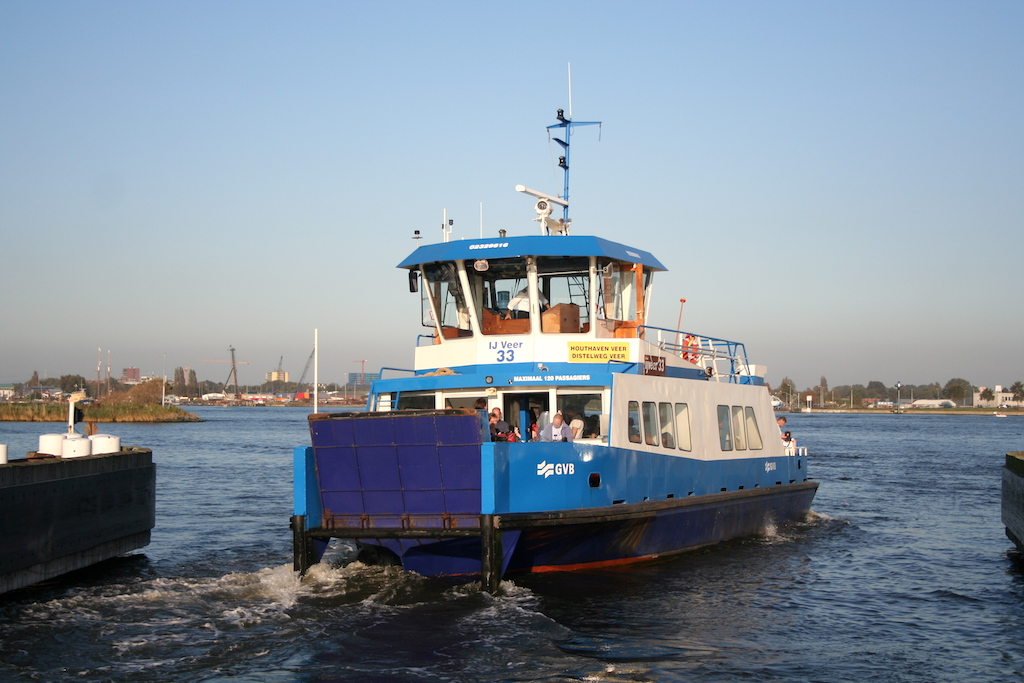
IJ ferry 33.

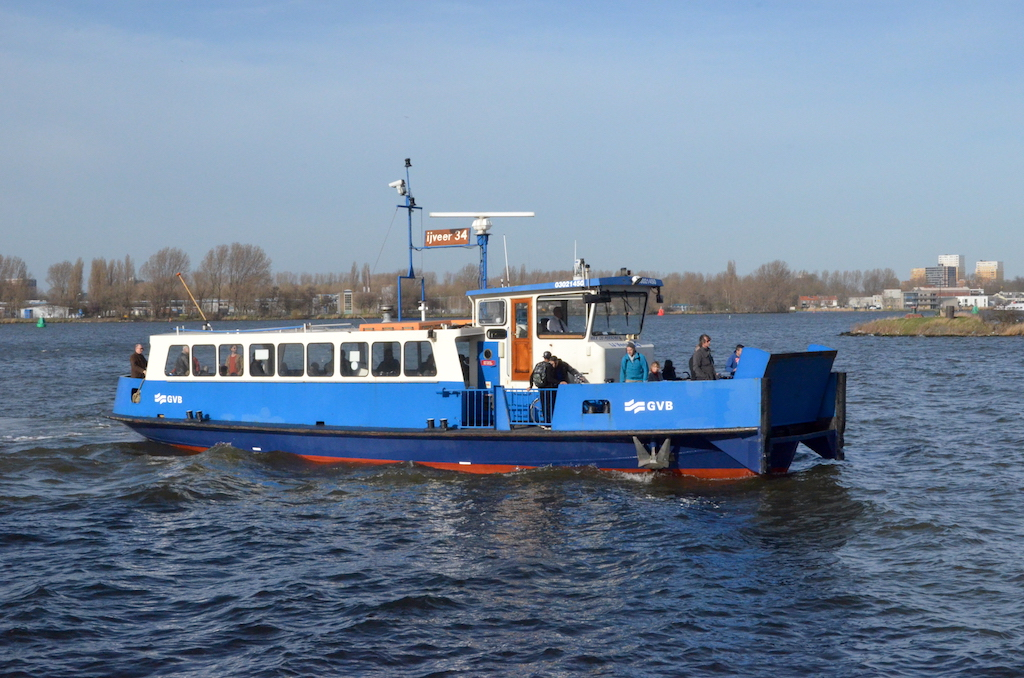
IJ ferry 34.

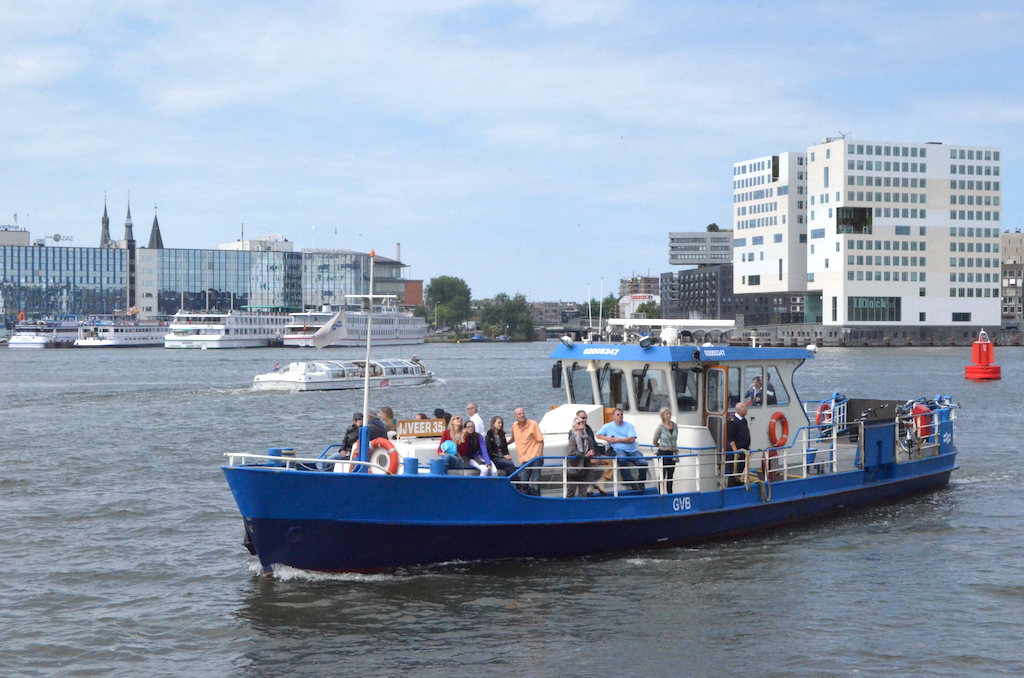
IJ ferry 35.

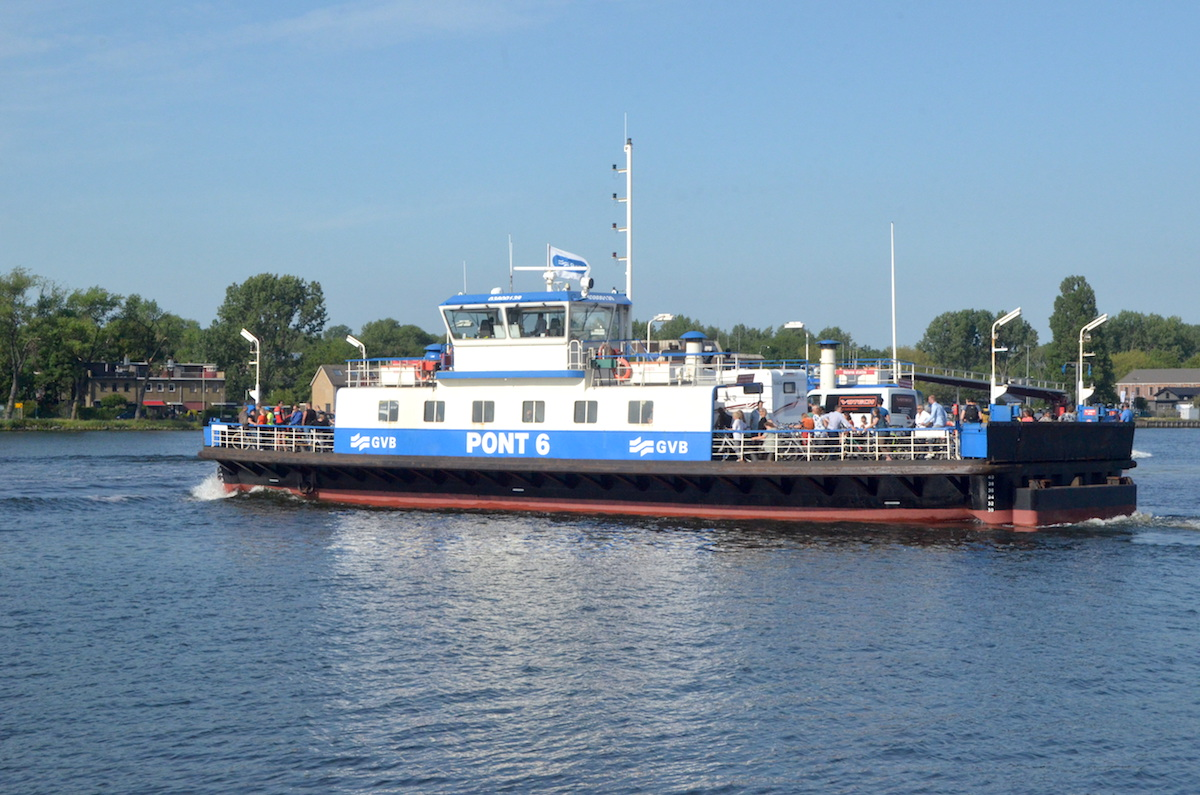
GVB ferry 6 on the North Sea Canal by the Hemkade.

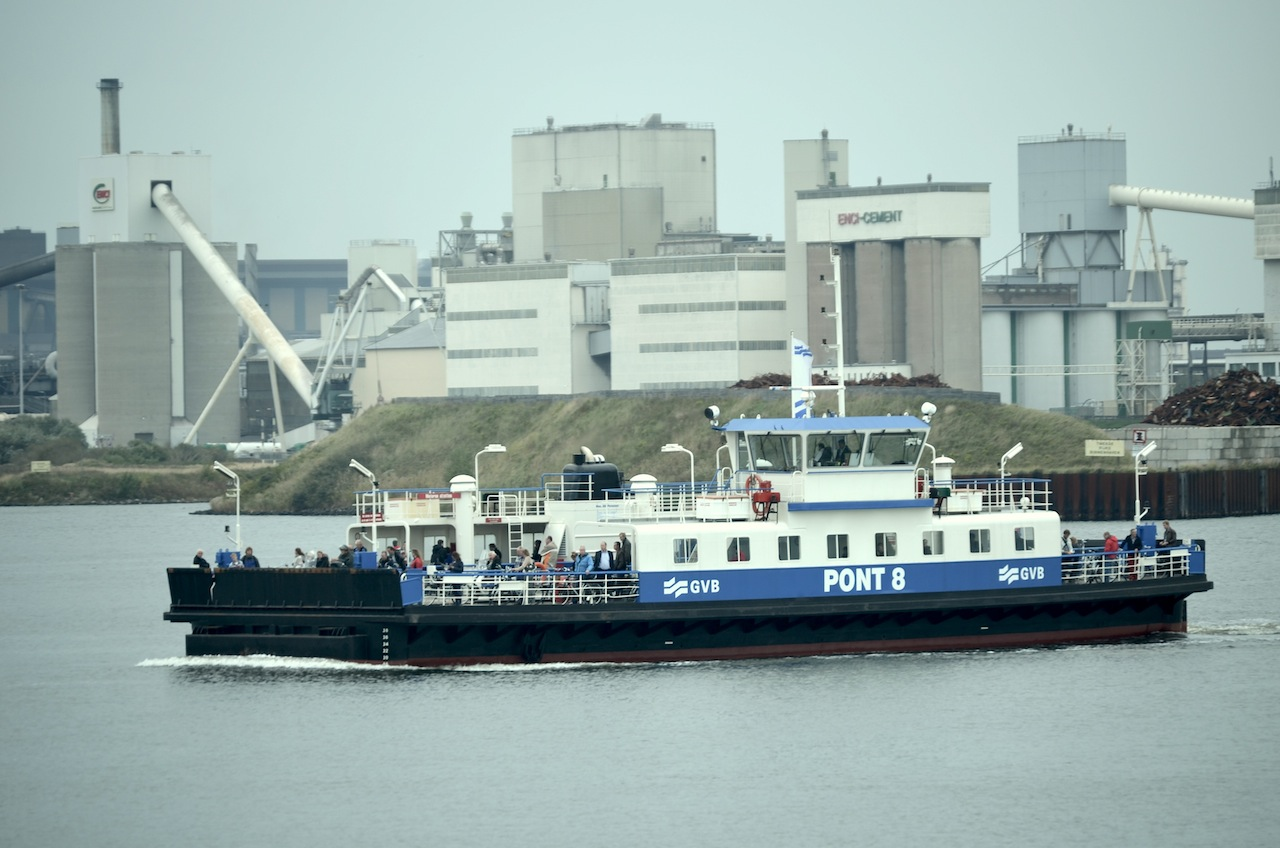
GVB ferry 8 on the North Sea Canal near Velsen.

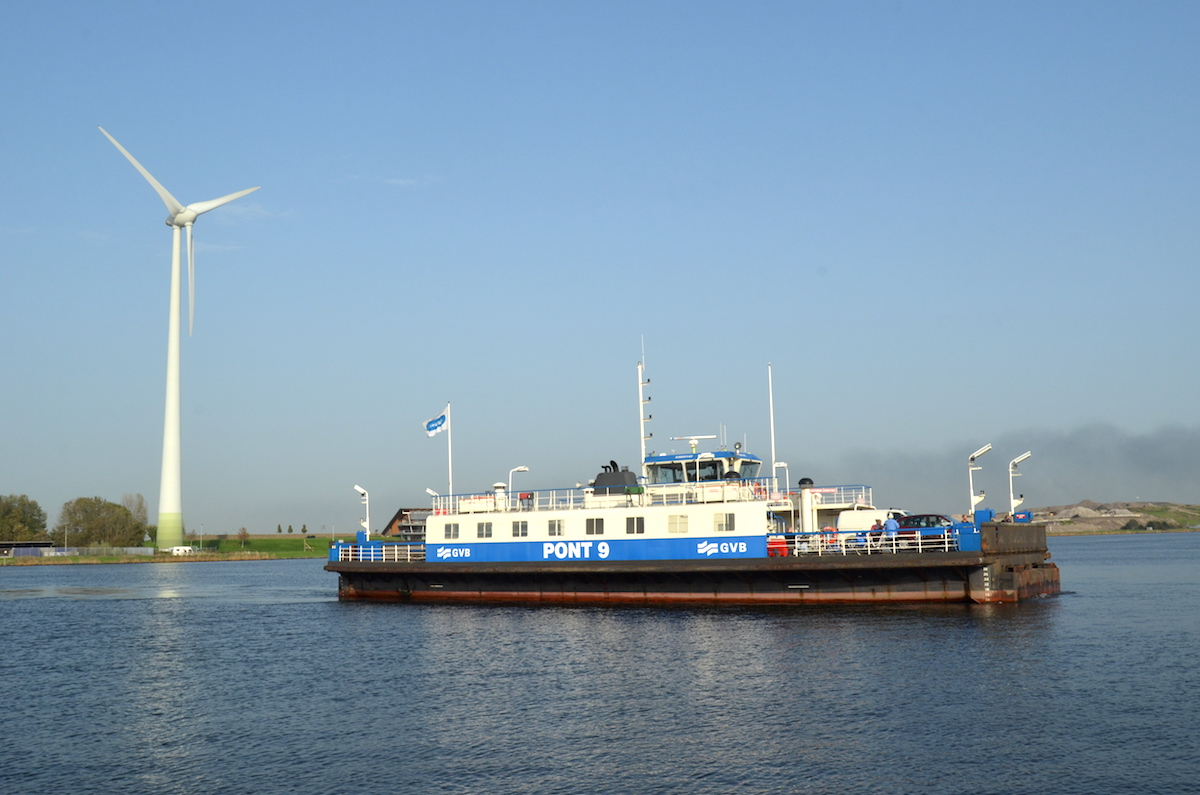
GVB ferry 9 on the North Sea Canal near Buitenhuizen.

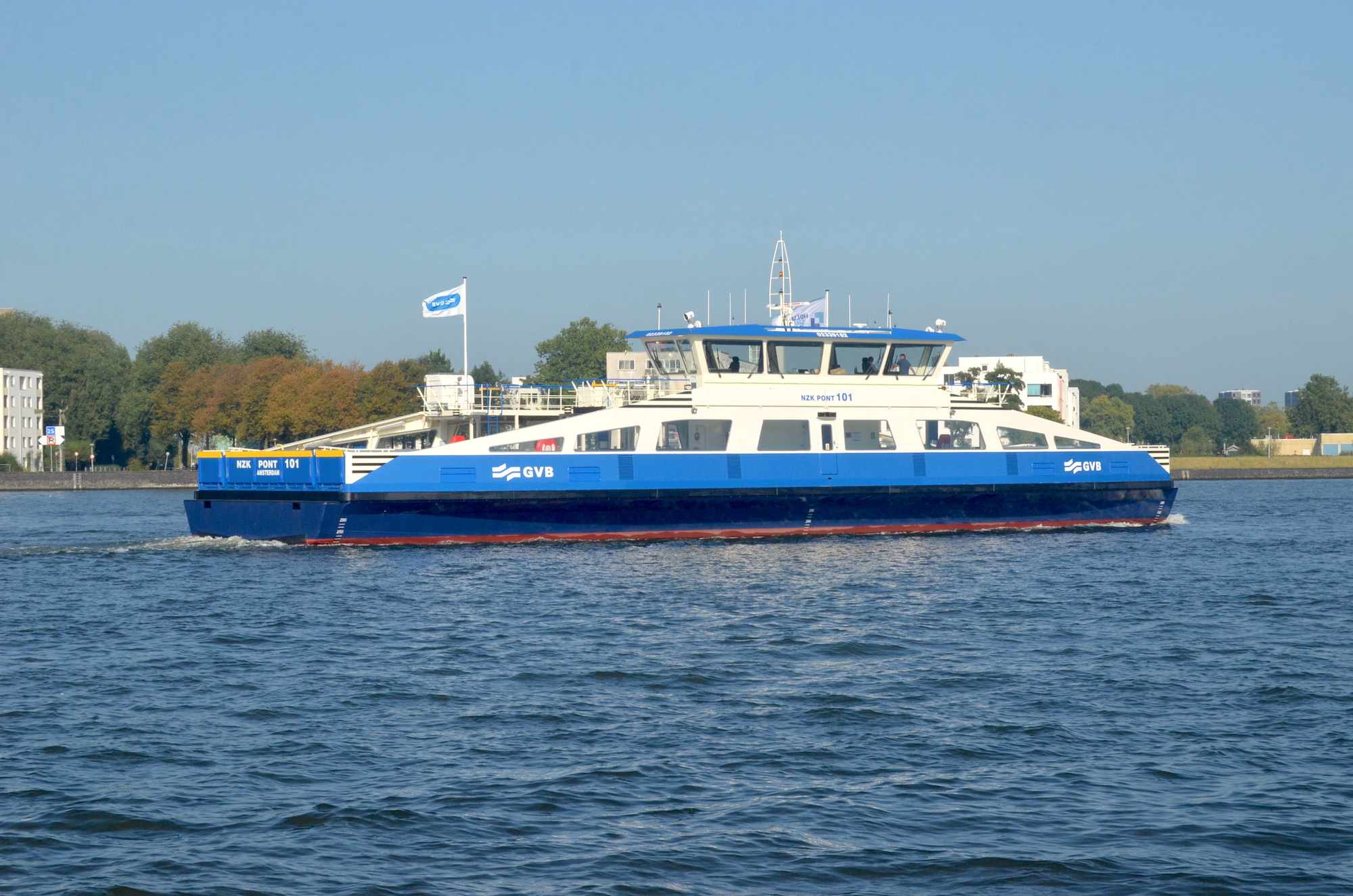
GVB NZK-ferry 101 (North sea canal ferry) on the IJ, 2021.

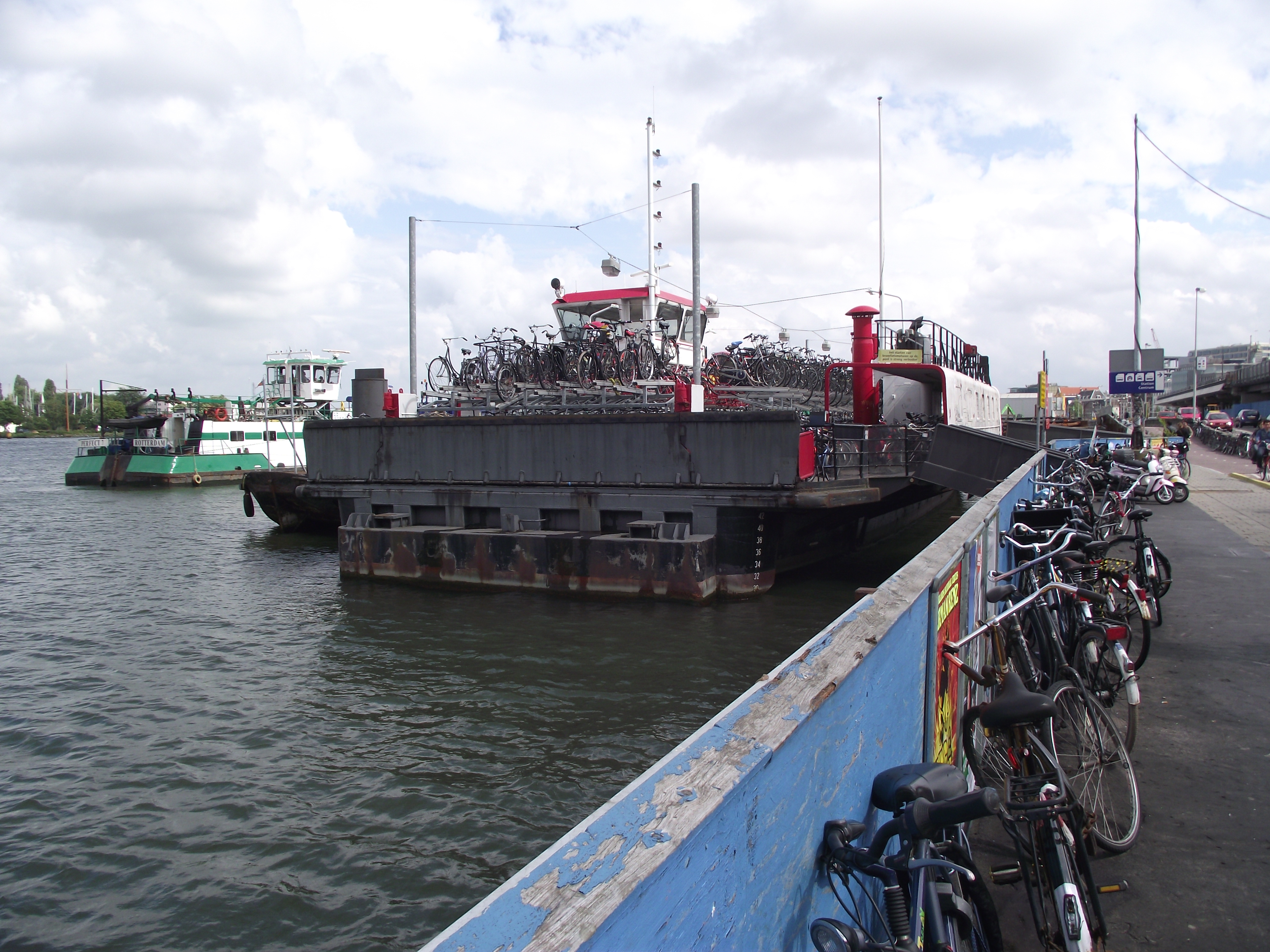
Bicycle parking on a moored ferry at Amsterdam CS. This is the old ferry 5 that used to sail over the North Sea Canal.

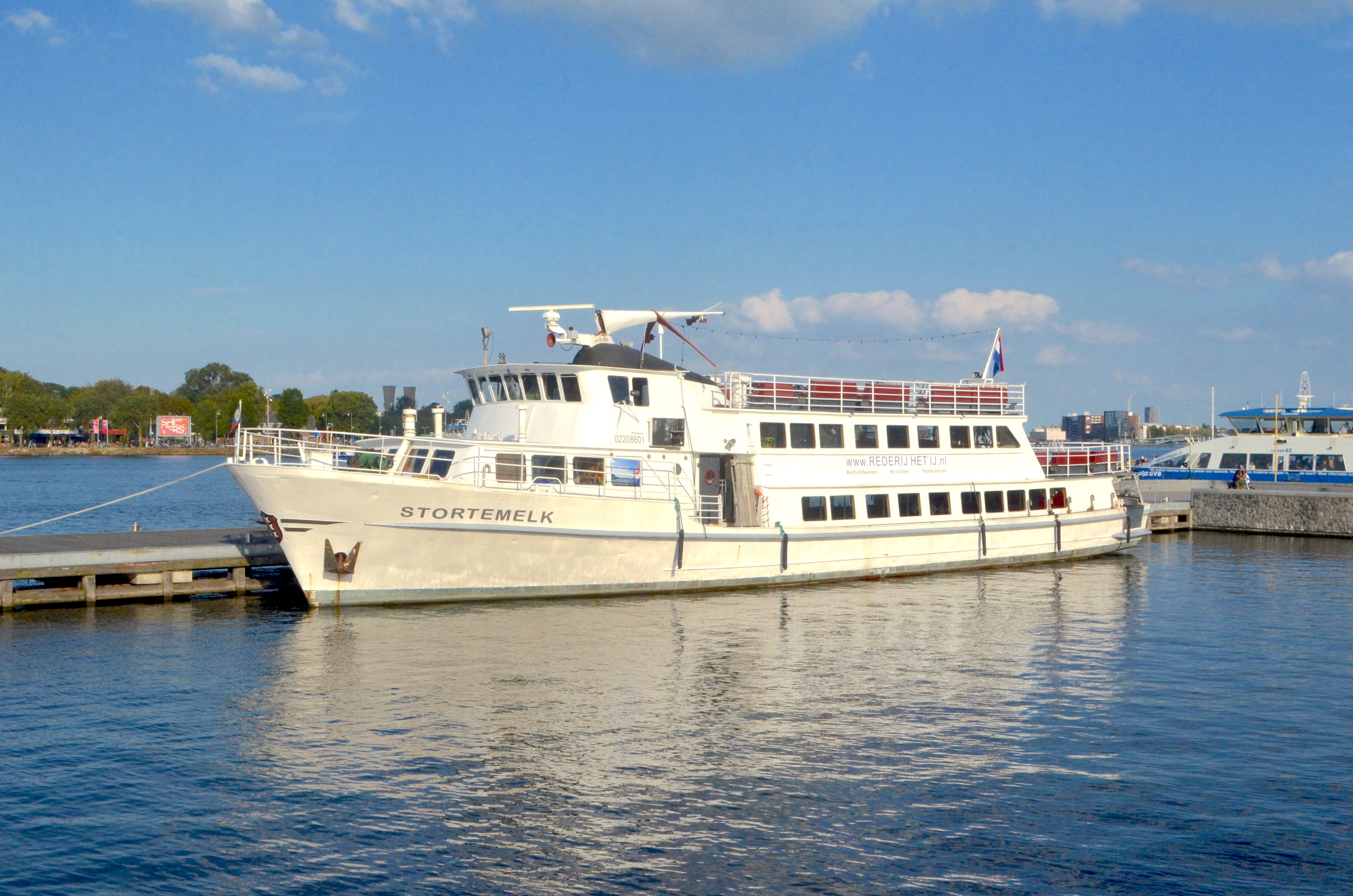
The formar ferry boat Stortemelk which is being used as a party boat on the IJ since 2015. September 2023.
