= Hoge vuurtoren van IJmuiden =

Lighthouse in IJmuiden, Netherlands

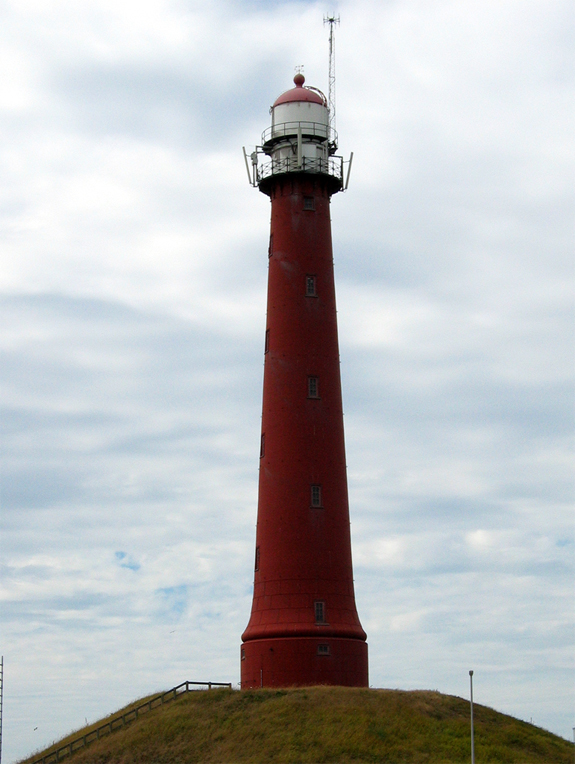
- Hoge vuurtoren van IJmuiden
- Location: IJmuiden, Netherlands
- Coordinates: 52°27′39″N 4°34′58″E

Tower
- Constructed: 1878
- Construction: Cast iron
- Height: 43 metres (141 ft)
- Shape: cylindrical tower with balcony and lantern
- Markings: tower reddish brown and white lantern
- Heritage: Rijksmonument

Light
- First lit: February 1878
- Focal height: 53 metres (174 ft)
- Lens: two 4th order Fresnel lenses
- Intensity: 3,500,000 cd
- Range: 29 nautical miles (54 km)
- Characteristic: Fl W 5s.
- Netherlands no.: NL-1332

The hoge vuurtoren van IJmuiden ("high lighthouse of IJmuiden") is a round, cast-iron lighthouse in IJmuiden, Netherlands, designed by Quirinus Harder. It was built in 1878 by D.A. Schretlen & Co, a company in Leiden.

Together with the Lage vuurtoren van IJmuiden, the 35-meter high lighthouse forms a pair of leading lights marking the IJgeul (the entrance on the North Sea to the North Sea Canal). The lighthouse has 159 steps; it is unmanned and not open for visitors.

== See also ==
- List of lighthouses in the Netherlands
- Cast-iron architecture
