= Lage vuurtoren van IJmuiden =

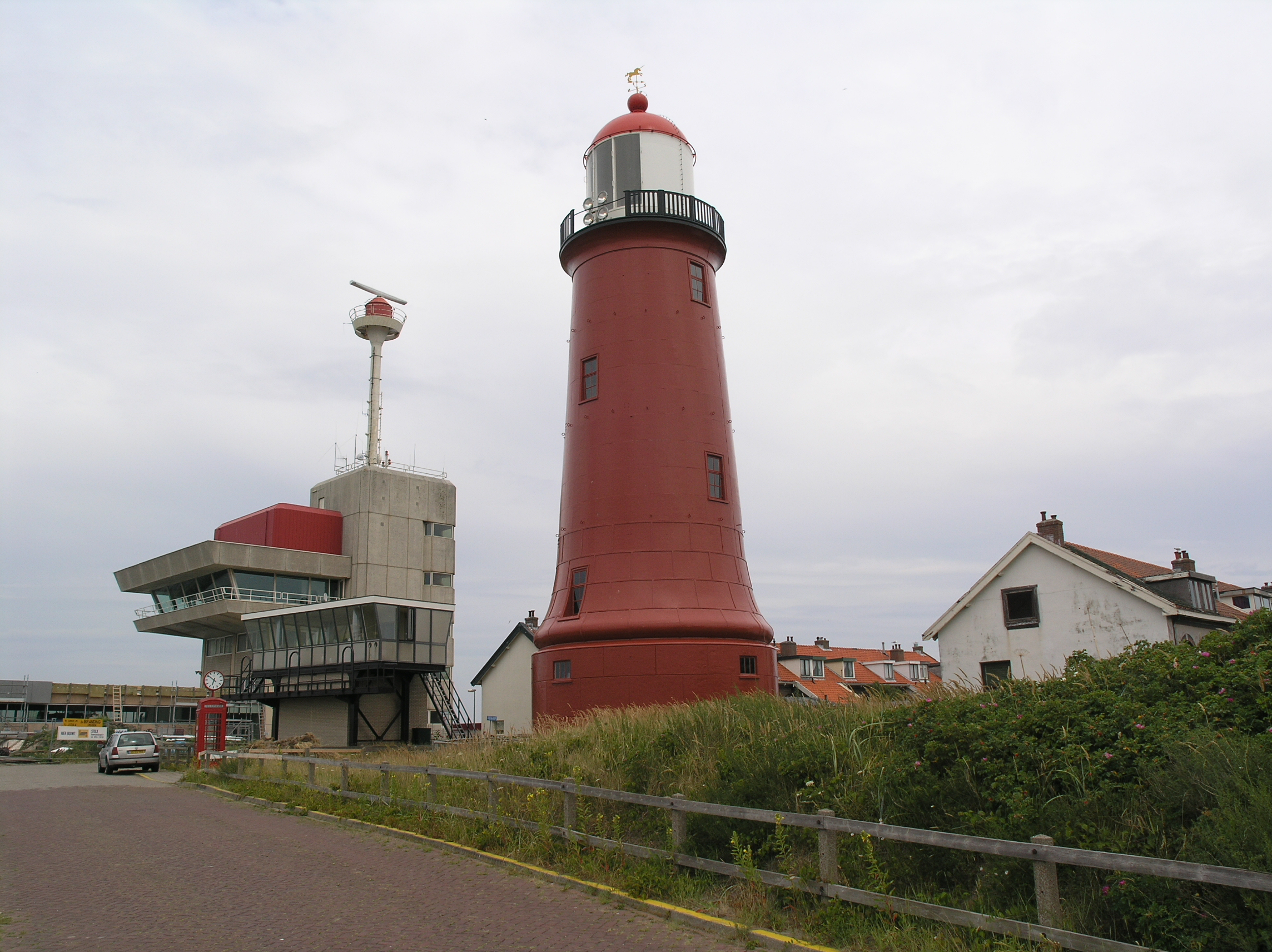
- Lage vuurtoren van IJmuiden
- Location: IJmuiden, Netherlands
- Coordinates: 52°27′42.6″N 4°34′28.6″E

Tower
- Constructed: 1878
- Construction: cast iron tower
- Height: 24 metres (79 ft)
- Shape: cylindrical tower with balcony and lantern
- Markings: red brown tower and dome lantern, white lantern
- Heritage: Rijksmonument

Light
- First lit: 1879
- Focal height: 31 metres (102 ft)
- Intensity: white: 23,000 cd red: 5,500 cd
- Range: white: 16 nautical miles (30 km) red: 13 nautical miles (24 km)
- Characteristic: F WR
- Netherlands no.: NL-1330

The Lage vuurtoren van IJmuiden ("low lighthouse of IJmuiden") is a round, cast-iron lighthouse in IJmuiden, Netherlands, designed by Quirinus Harder. It was built in 1878 by D.A. Schretlen & Co, a company in Leiden and activated the following year. In 1909, the top three sections were moved to Vlieland where they serve as a separate lighthouse. In 1966 the lighthouse was moved slightly.

Together with the Hoge vuurtoren van IJmuiden, the 24-metre high lighthouse forms a pair of leading lights marking the IJgeul (the entrance on the North Sea to the North Sea Canal). The lighthouse now has five storeys and 88 steps; it is unmanned and not open for visitors. Since 1981 it is a Rijksmonument.

== See also ==
- List of lighthouses in the Netherlands
- Cast-iron architecture
