= IJmuiden sea lock =

Water navigation device serving Port of Amsterdam

IJmuiden Sea Lock
- Zeesluis IJmuiden
- 52°27′59″N 4°36′47″E
- Waterway: North Sea Canal
- Country: Netherlands
- County: Velsen
- First built: January 2022
- Length: 500 m (1,640 ft 5 in)
- Width: 70 m (229 ft 8 in)
- Fall: Varies according to sea-level

The IJmuiden sea lock (Dutch: zeesluis IJmuiden) serving Port of Amsterdam via the North Sea Canal is the largest lock in the world when considering dimensions. The lock, situated in IJmuiden in the municipality of Velsen, was opened on 26 January 2022 in the presence of King Willem-Alexander of the Netherlands. The locks of IJmuiden have a history dating back to 1876, when the largest lock of that era was opened.
