= Menno Geelen =

Dutch sports executive

Chief Executive Officer of AFC Ajax
- Incumbent
- Assumed office 1 July 2025
- Preceded by: Alex Kroes

Interim Chief Executive Officer of AFC Ajax
- In office 10 May 2024 – 1 July 2025
- Preceded by: Alex Kroes
- Succeeded by: Himself

Commercial Director of AFC Ajax
- In office 1 November 2016 – 10 May 2024
- Succeeded by: Cas Biesta (interim)

Personal details
- Born: 22 January 1982 (age 44) Huizen, Netherlands
- Education: Radboud University Nijmegen
- Occupation: Sports executive

Menno Geelen (born 22 January 1982) is a Dutch sports executive who currently serves as the Chief Executive Officer (Dutch: Algemeen Directeur) of Eredivisie club AFC Ajax. Having joined the club in 2010, he is considered the primary architect behind Ajax's modern commercial strategy.

== Early life and education ==
Geelen was born in Huizen, Netherlands. He studied Business Administration at Radboud University Nijmegen. Before entering the football industry, Geelen worked as a sports marketer for the agency Trefpunt Sports & Leisure Marketing.

== Executive career ==
=== Early years at Ajax ===
Geelen joined AFC Ajax in 2010 as an account manager in the club's sponsorship department. Within a few months, he was promoted to head of the department. By 2013, he was responsible for the entirety of Ajax's commercial operations, including sponsorships, ticketing, and merchandising.

=== Commercial Director ===
On 1 November 2016, Geelen was appointed as the club's Commercial Director, becoming the youngest director in Ajax's history. He was inducted as a statutory director on 16 November 2018, forming the executive board alongside CEO Edwin van der Sar and Technical Director Marc Overmars.

During his tenure, Geelen expanded Ajax's commercial revenue streams, overseeing long-term sponsorship extensions with principal partners such as Ziggo and Adidas. Under his leadership, the club also launched successful merchandise campaigns, notably the 2021–22 Bob Marley-inspired third kit. In the summer of 2021, despite reported interest from English Premier League clubs, Geelen signed a new long-term contract with Ajax.

=== Chief Executive Officer ===
Following the suspension of CEO Alex Kroes, Geelen was appointed interim Chief Executive Officer of Ajax on 10 May 2024. Cas Biesta assumed his duties as interim Chief Commercial Officer.

On 28 March 2025, Ajax announced Geelen's permanent appointment as CEO, with a contract running until mid-2027. Media reports indicated Geelen opted for a shorter extension to serve a transitional role, aiming to eventually pave the way for a former Ajax player to succeed him. In March 2026, he oversaw the appointment of Jordi Cruyff as the club's technical director.

=== European club representation ===
In February 2026, Geelen was elected to the UEFA Club Competitions Committee, representing the interests of European clubs at a strategic level regarding competition formats, revenue distribution, and access criteria. On 29 September 2026, he was elected to the board of directors of European Football Clubs, representing continental clubs within the organization's governing body.

=== Ajax Foundation ===
On 4 February 2026, Geelen was appointed chairman of the board of the Ajax Foundation, succeeding Alex Kroes.

== Personal life ==
Geelen resides in Amsterdam-Zuidoost. In 2006, his 27-year-old brother Fedde passed away from cancer, an event Geelen has referenced regarding his perspective on sports and management.
