= IJgeul =

Trench in the Dutch North Sea

Coordinates: 52°27′36″N 4°30′00″E

The IJgeul or IJ trench is a man-made excavation on the bottom of the North Sea, off the coast of IJmuiden, which provides access to large vessels with deep drafts to the port of IJmuiden, and also via the North Sea Canal, to the port of Amsterdam (just like the Eurogeul for the port of Rotterdam).

The name comes from IJ and geul, a Dutch word meaning "the portion of a channel that often has to be dredged."

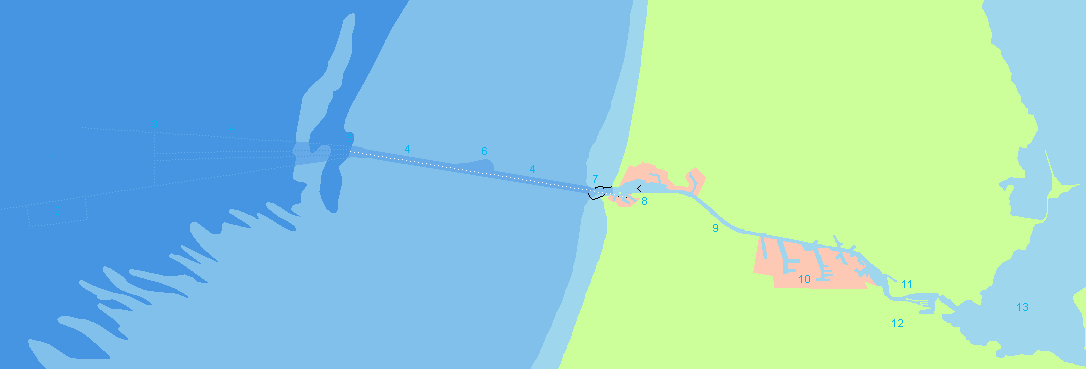
1. Exterior corridors; 2. Mooring zone; 3. 43 km of sea lane until IJmuiden; 4. IJgeul; 5. 23 km of sea lane until IJmuiden; 6. Turn around zone; 7. 0 Point; 8. IJmuiden locks; 9. North Sea Canal; 10. The port of Amsterdam; 11. The IJ; 12. Amsterdam; 13. IJmeer; Dotted white line the leading light.

== History ==
When the IJgeul opened in 1982, the maximum draft was at 16.5 meters. In 2006, the Minister of Transport decided to deepen and extend the IJgeul. Public works have dredged the channel to 17.8 meters. In addition, the IJgeul was extended in length from 23 to 43 kilometers.

== Circulation ==
Traffic is strictly regulated; vessels must follow the leading lights over the last 23 km, which are formed by the Hoge vuurtoren van IJmuiden and the Lage vuurtoren van IJmuiden. 18 km from the coast, a space was created so that in case of problems, it is possible for vessels to turn back.

The Prostar Sailing Directions from 2006 provides detailed approach and restriction information.

== Attendance ==
The average attendance is 90 vessels with a maximum draft per year.

== See also ==
The Eurogeul, a similar but larger channel dug some years before for the port of Rotterdam.
