= Johan Plat =

Dutch footballer and coach (born 1987)

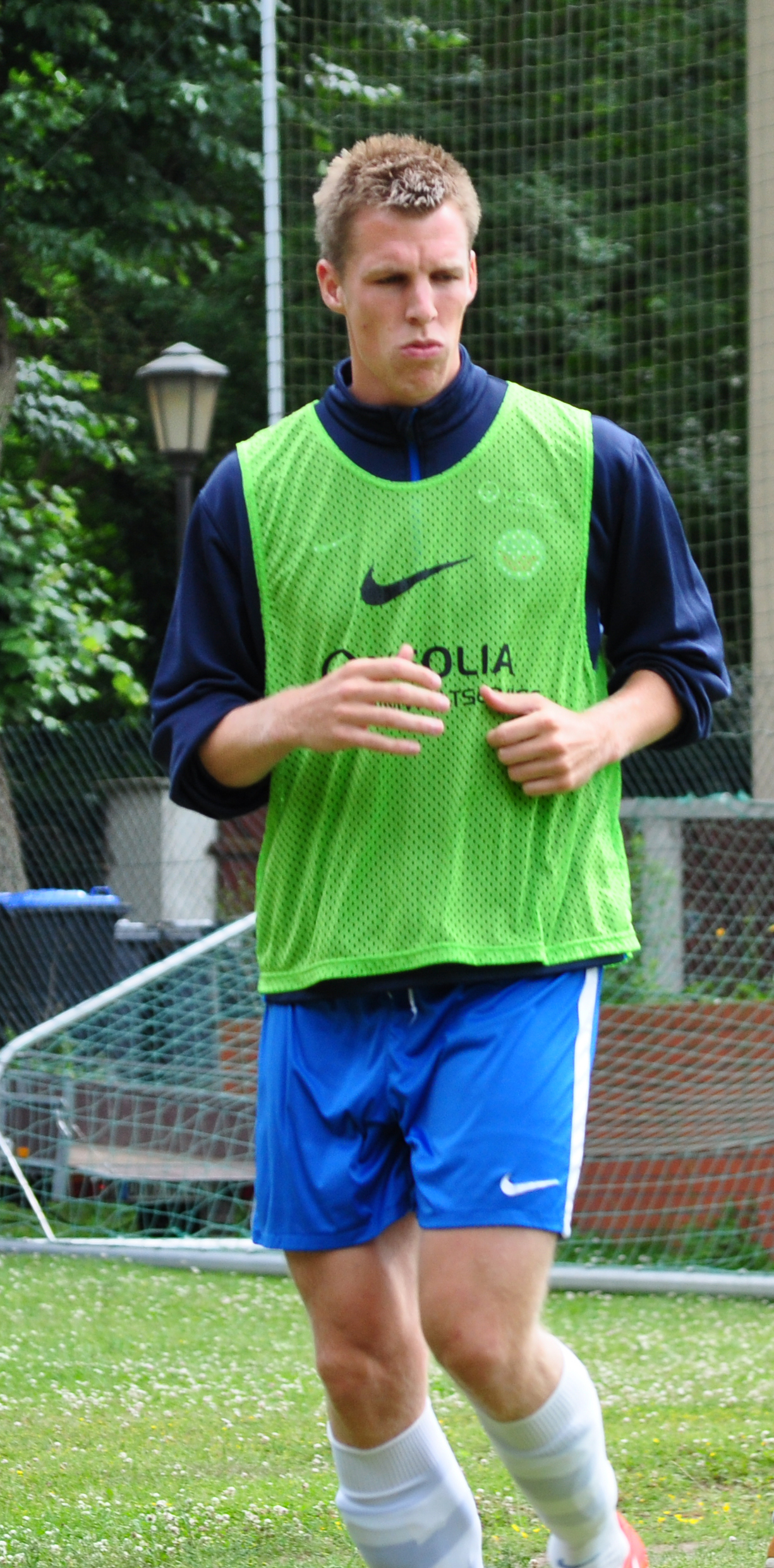

Personal information
- Full name: Johannes Cornelis Jozef Plat
- Date of birth: 26 February 1987 (age 39)
- Place of birth: Purmerend, Netherlands
- Height: 1.86 m (6 ft 1 in)
- Position: Striker

Team information
- Current team: Cambuur (head coach)

Youth career
- RKAV Volendam
- Ajax
- –2006: AZ

Senior career*
Years	Team	Apps	(Gls)
2007–2008	FC Volendam	14	(1)
2008–2009	FC Zwolle	18	(2)
2009–2010	FC Dordrecht	11	(1)
2010	FC Oss	13	(5)
2010–2012	Telstar	59	(25)
2012–2014	Hansa Rostock	54	(14)
2014–2015	Roda JC	19	(7)
2015	Katwijk	5	(0)

Managerial career
- 2016–2018: Katwijk (assistant)
- 2018: Katwijk (caretaker)
- 2018–2019: RKAV Volendam (youth)
- 2019–2021: FC Volendam U21
- 2021–2023: PEC Zwolle (assistant)
- 2023–2025: Castellón (assistant)
- 2025: Castellón
- 2026–: Cambuur
- * Club domestic league appearances and goals

Johannes "Johan" Cornelis Jozef Plat (born 26 February 1987) is a Dutch professional football manager and former player who is the head coach of Eredivisie club Cambuur.

== Playing career ==
Plat formerly played as a forward for FC Volendam, FC Zwolle, FC Dordrecht, FC Oss, Telstar, Hansa Rostock, Roda JC and VV Katwijk.

== Managerial career ==
After retiring, Plat worked as an assistant coach at several clubs before forming a partnership with Dick Schreuder at PEC Zwolle in 2021. On 20 January 2025, he was appointed manager of Castellón after Schreuder was sacked; he was previously working as an assistant at the same club.

On 16 September 2025, Plat was sacked from the Orelluts after a winless start of the 2025–26 campaign.

On 8 April 2026, Plat was appointed head coach of Cambuur on a two-year contract with the option of a further season, succeeding Henk de Jong. The club had recently won promotion to the Eredivisie for the 2026–27 season.

== Managerial statistics ==
As of 21 November 2026

Managerial record by team and tenure
Team	Nat	From	To	Record								Ref
Team	Nat	From	To	G	W	D	L	GF	GA	GD	Win %	Ref
Katwijk (caretaker)	(Netherlands)	2 February 2018	12 February 2018	1	1	0	0	2	1	+1	100.00	
Castellón	(Spain)	20 January 2025	16 September 2025	24	6	8	10	39	39	+0	25.00	
Cambuur	(Netherlands)	1 July 2026	present	13	5	3	5	26	29	−3	38.46	
Total				38	12	11	15	67	69	−2	31.58	—
