= Levi Schwiebbe =

Dutch footballer (born 1986)

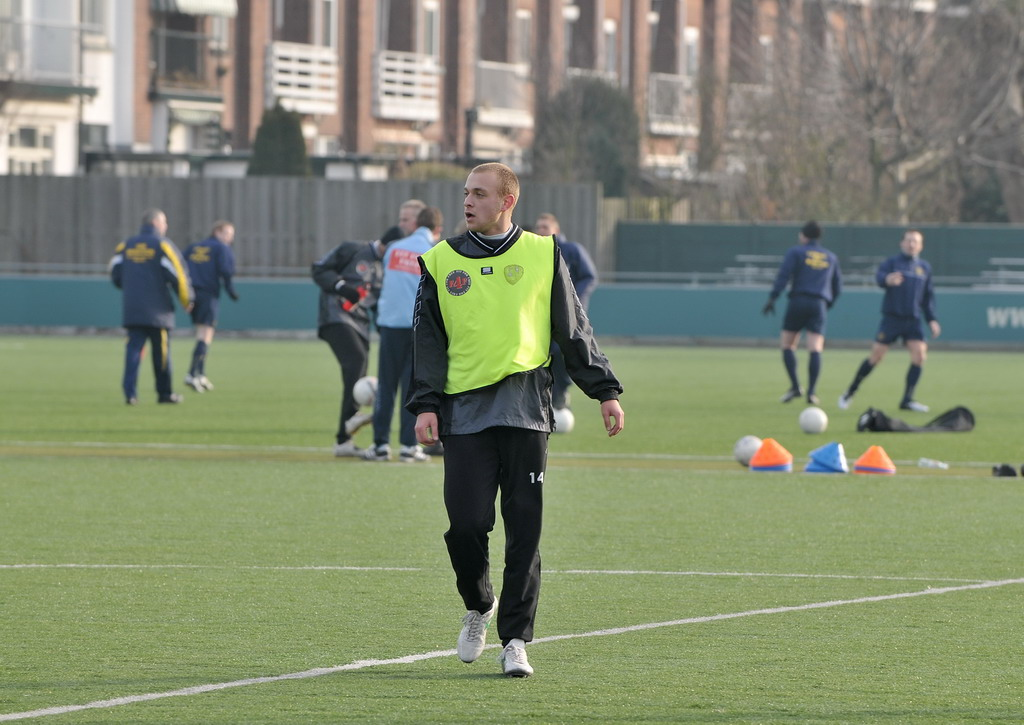

Personal information
- Date of birth: 13 September 1986 (age 40)
- Place of birth: Gouda, Netherlands
- Position: Midfielder

Team information
- Current team: ADO Den Haag (youth coach)

Youth career
- WSE Waddinxveen
- ADO Den Haag

Senior career*
Years	Team	Apps	(Gls)
2005–2010	ADO Den Haag	65	(0)
2009	→ Haarlem (loan)	9	(0)
2010–2012	AGOVV Apeldoorn	55	(1)
2012–2014	FC Volendam	56	(2)
2014–2021	SVV Scheveningen		

Managerial career
- 2019–2020: ADO Den Haag (physical coach)
- 2020–: ADO Den Haag (youth coach)
- * Club domestic league appearances and goals

Levi Schwiebbe (born 13 September 1986) is a Dutch retired footballer who played as a midfielder.

== Career ==
Schwiebbe began his career with WSE Waddinxveen and was than scouted from ADO Den Haag. He was sent on loan to Haarlem in January 2009. In 2010, he joined AGOVV Apeldoorn and stayed until the summer of 2012 when he signed with FC Volendam.

== Coaching career ==
During his time as an active player for SVV Scheveningen, Schwiebbe also worked as the person in charge of the club's youth development. In March 2019, Schwiebbe began working at ADO Den Haag as a physical coach. From there, he worked in several roles within the academy of ADO.
