= Alex Kroes =

Dutch football executive (born 1974)

- Born: 1974 (age 51–52); Utrecht, Netherlands
- Occupation: Vice President of LASK
- Years active: 2026–present

Alexander "Alex" Kroes (Utrecht, 23 September 1974) is a Dutch football executive and entrepreneur. Since June 2026, he has served as Vice President of Austrian football club LASK.

Previously, he held executive positions at AFC Ajax and AZ Alkmaar and was a majority shareholder and co-director of Go Ahead Eagles. From 2000 to 2018, he was co-founder and Managing Director of Sports Entertainment Group (SEG), an internationally operating sports and entertainment agency..

== Biography ==
Kroes grew up in Weesp, playing as a youth player in all Ajax youth teams and playing in several national youth teams, but ultimately did not break through to the first team.

After earning his master's degree in business economics from Vrije Universiteit Amsterdam, Kroes set up his own telemarketing company in 1994. In 2000, Kroes entered the player agent business with the agency Sports Entertainment Group (SEG), which grew into the largest football agency firm in the Netherlands and was among the top in the world with clients such as Robin van Persie and Memphis Depay.

=== Go Ahead Eagles ===
After Kroes sold SEG to a Dutch investment company in early 2018, he became a majority shareholder and co-director of Go Ahead Eagles in early 2019. In May 2021, Go Ahead promoted to the Eredivisie in the final round of play.

In November 2021, the KNVB announced that Go Ahead Eagles was the financially healthiest club in the Netherlands. Within the Financial Rating System of the football association, Go Ahead scored the most points. On 16 May 2022, it was announced that Kroes intended to sell his share package to Kees Vierhouten - a shareholder since 2021 - and leave as owner of Go Ahead Eagles as of 1 July 2022.

=== AZ ===
On 1 December 2022, Kroes joined AZ as director of International Football Strategy. There, together with Robert Eenhoorn (general manager) and Max Huiberts (director of football affairs), he formed the board and ran the strategy and day-to-day management of the Alkmaar-based club. One of Kroes' main areas of focus was to further exploit AZ's football expertise at home and abroad. His contract with AZ expired 1 September 2023.

=== Ajax ===
On 2 August 2023, Ajax announced its intention to appoint Kroes as the club’s Chief Executive Officer and Chairman of the Management Board, succeeding Edwin van der Sar. Due to a competition clause in his contract with AZ, agreement had to be reached between Kroes and the Alkmaar club. It was agreed that Kroes could begin his duties at Ajax as of 15 March 2024.

On 2 April 2024, Ajax suspended Kroes after it emerged that, shortly before the public announcement of his intended appointment as Chief Executive Officer, he had purchased more than 17,000 shares in AFC Ajax NV. The club stated that the transactions might have breached rules relating to insider trading and announced that it would investigate the matter further. Ajax initially expressed its intention to terminate its relationship with Kroes.

Following a period of internal discussions and legal review, Ajax decided on 25 April 2024 to continue its cooperation with Kroes. He returned to the Management Board in the role of Technical Director., while the assessment of the share transactions by the relevant authorities was still ongoing.

In April 2025, it was announced that the Netherlands Authority for the Financial Markets (AFM) had concluded its investigation into Kroes concerning suspected insider trading and would impose no sanctions on either Kroes or the club.

In November 2025, following a joint decision by the club’s management, Kroes dismissed head coach John Heitinga due to disappointing results in the domestic league and the UEFA Champions League. At the same time, Kroes made his own position available with immediate effect, explaining that, as Technical Director, he felt a particular responsibility for Heitinga’s early departure. In January 2026, Ajax announced that Jordi Cruijff would succeed Kroes as Technical Director as of 1 February 2026. Kroes left Ajax as boardmember in February 2026.

LASK

On 16 June 2026, Kroes was appointed Vice President of Austrian football club LASK. LASK is a partner club of Ajax. In this role, he is involved in the further development of the club’s sporting organisation, international strategy and continued professionalisation. According to LASK, Kroes contributes his experience and international network within European football to these areas.
