= North Sea Canal =

Dutch ship canal

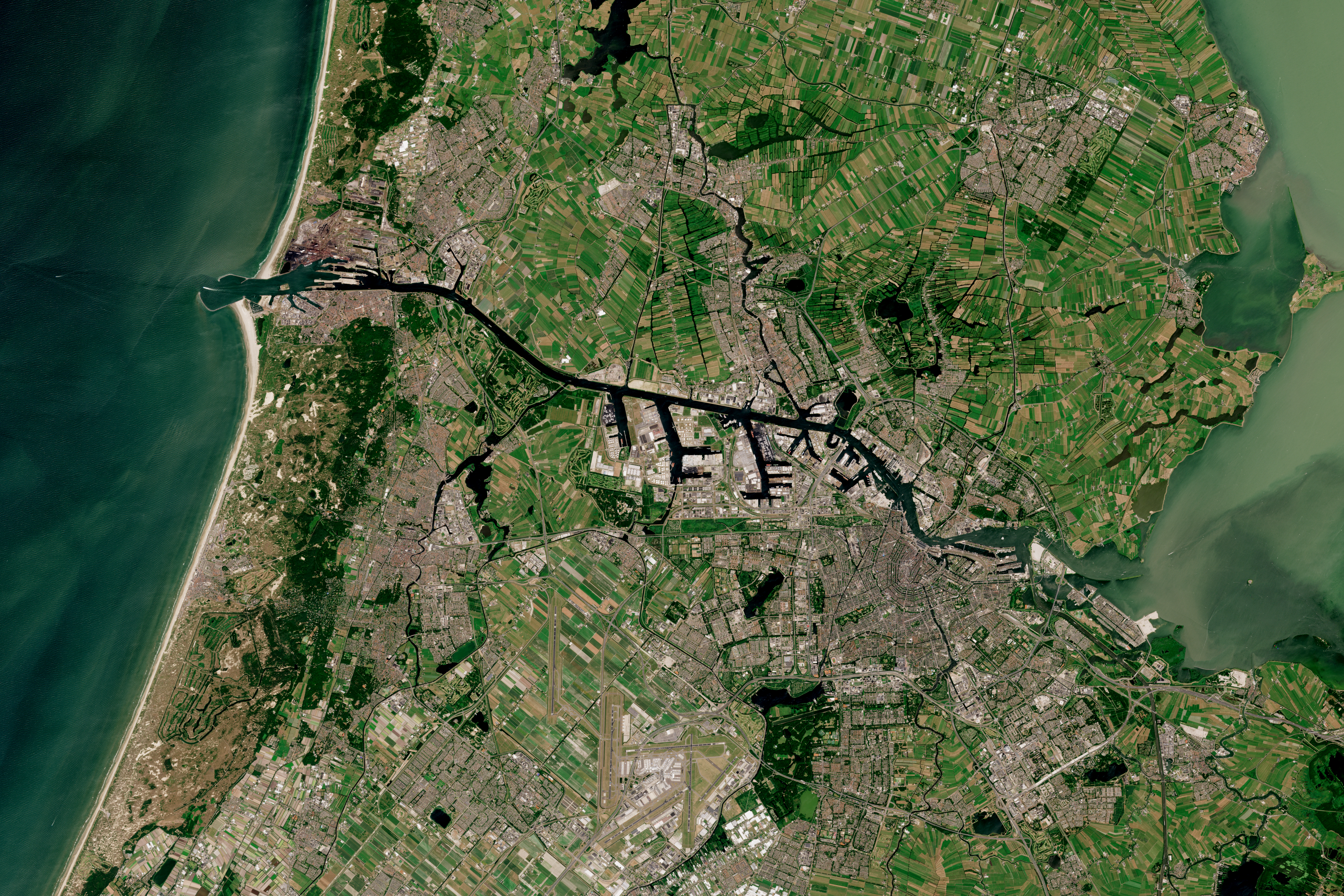

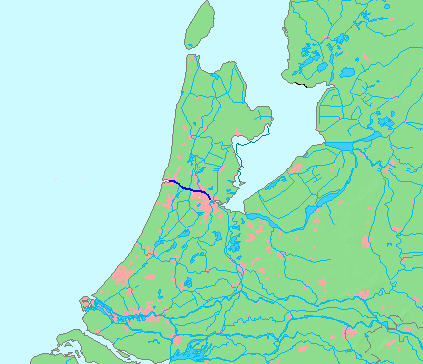
- Location of canal in dark blue.
- Native name: Noordzeekanaal (Dutch)

Location
- Country: Netherlands
- Province: North Holland

Physical characteristics
- Source: IJ
  - location: Amsterdam
  - coordinates: 52°23′45″N 4°53′30″E
- Mouth: North Sea
  - location: IJmuiden
  - coordinates: 52°27′50″N 4°33′30″E
  - elevation: 0 m (0 ft)
- Length: 25 km (16 mi)

The North Sea Canal (Dutch: Noordzeekanaal) is a Dutch ship canal from Amsterdam to the North Sea at IJmuiden, constructed between 1865 and 1876 to enable seafaring vessels to reach the port of Amsterdam. This man-made channel terminates at Amsterdam in the closed-off IJ Bay, which in turn connects to the Amsterdam-Rhine Canal.

The drainage of the canal to the North Sea is done through the IJmuiden sea lock, augmented by the largest pumping station in Europe. This system is vital to the groundwater management of the Western Netherlands.

== History ==
To improve the connection between the harbour of Amsterdam and the North Sea, the North Holland Canal was built in 1824. But this long and narrow canal was quickly inadequate to handle the growing boat traffic. A few decades later it was decided to dig a new canal at the narrowest point in Holland and thereby providing the shortest route to the sea.

Digging began on 8 March 1865, at the dunes of Breesaap and lasted until 1876. Since no Dutch company was willing to take on this task, the project was awarded to an English contractor.

The North Sea Canal was built by digging a channel through the old IJ Bay and lining it with dikes, after which the remaining portions of the IJ Bay were reclaimed and turned into polders. From this bay to the sea, a new canal was dug through the dunes at Velsen. To accommodate drainage of and shipping on the tributaries of the IJ, such as the Spaarne, the Zaan, and the Nauerna Canal, nine auxiliary canals needed to be dug as well (Side Canals "A" to "I").

A small set of locks (Zuidersluis) were built at the mouth in 1876 where the new town of IJmuiden (Dutch for "IJ Mouth") formed. In 1896 the Middle Locks (Middensluis) were built, followed by the North Locks (Noordersluis) in 1929, which were Europe's largest locks at that time.

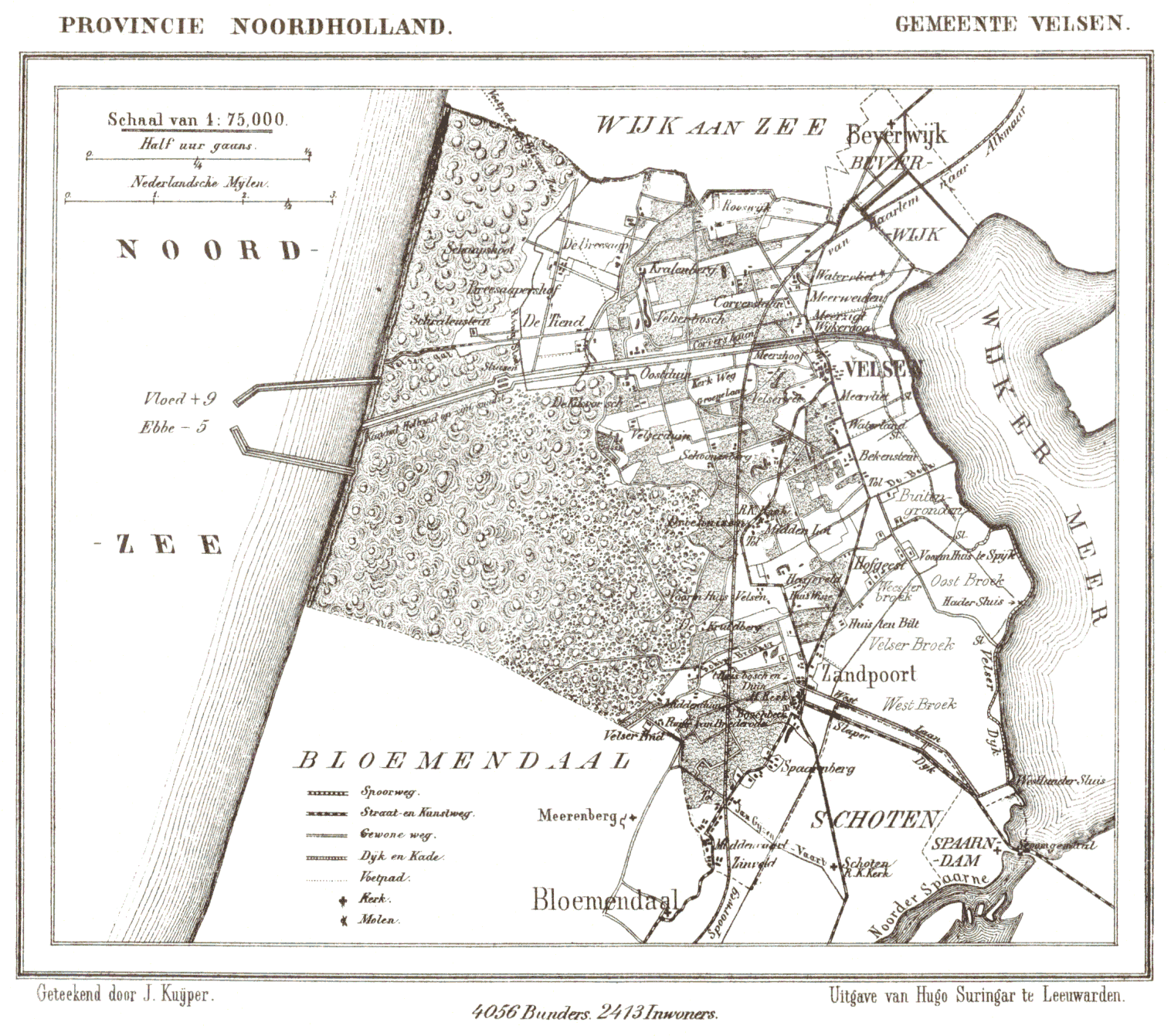
Historic map of Velsen showing the western portion of the IJ and the planned route of the canal.

At the eastern end of the canal, east of Amsterdam, the IJ Bay was open to the Zuiderzee until 1872 when the Oranje Locks (Oranjesluizen) were built. With the completion of these locks the North Sea Canal and IJ Bay were no longer open to the sea and a specific water level could be maintained.

The canal was dug using manual labour. The workers lived in horrid conditions, being housed in huts built from twigs, driftwood, sod, and straw, where disease, fights, and alcohol abuse were rampant.

On 1 November 1876, the North Sea Canal was officially opened by King William III of the Netherlands. Over the years the canal has been widened and deepened several times.

== Side canals ==
The North Sea Canal and the IJ have 10 side canals (in Dutch: Zijkanaal), which connect to rivers and other canals which used to flow into the former IJ Bay before its reclamation.

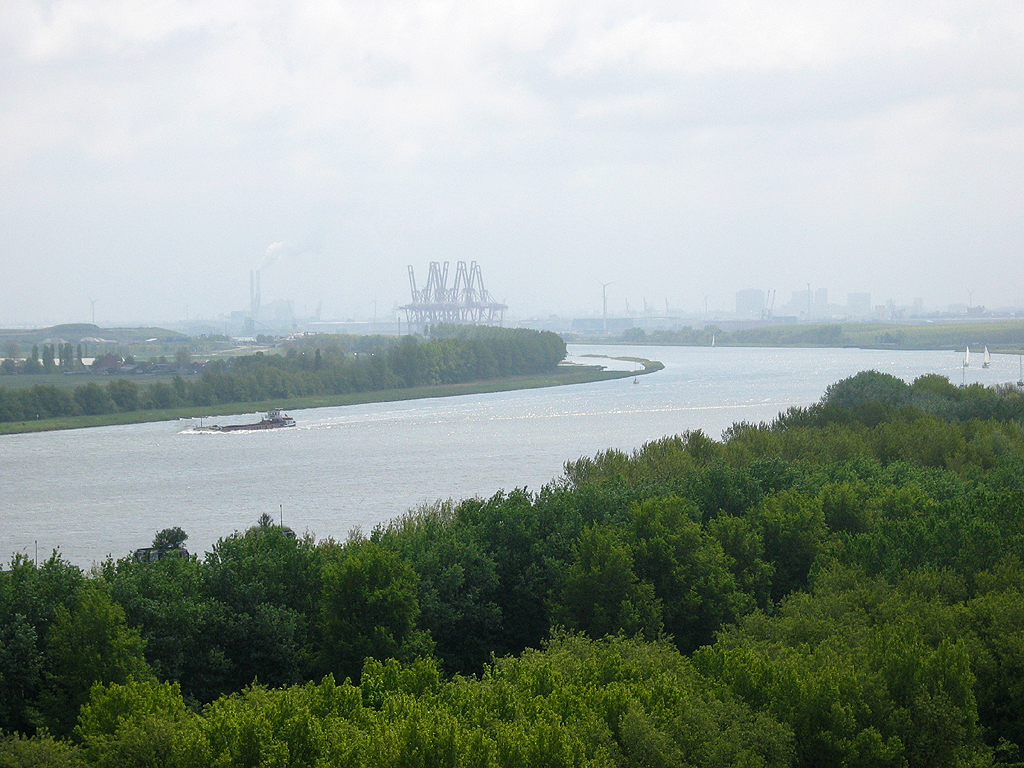
Landscape of canal

- Zijkanaal A – connects the harbour of Beverwijk to the North Sea Canal, also an inundation canal of the Stelling van Amsterdam.
- Zijkanaal B – connected Spaarndam to the North Sea Canal, but was cut off from it by the construction of the A9 motorway in the 1960s. It is now used for canoeing and mooring of houseboats.
- Zijkanaal C – connects the Spaarne river at Spaarndam to the North Sea Canal at Buitenhuizen, and also functions as the main drainage canal of the Rijnland water board. The A9 motorway has an operable bridge over this side canal.
- Zijkanaal D – connects the Nauerna Canal to the North Sea Canal.
- Zijkanaal E – a very short canal connecting the south end of Westzaan to the North Sea Canal.
- Zijkanaal F – connected Halfweg to the North Sea Canal, but is now mostly backfilled. A small portion remains and is used as a drainage canal.
- Zijkanaal G – connects Zaandam and the Zaan River to the North Sea Canal.
- Zijkanaal H – connects the Barndegat to the North Sea Canal.
- Zijkanaal I – connects the East Zaan Overtoom to the IJ Bay.
- Zijkanaal K – connects the harbour of Nieuwendam to the IJ Bay.

== Approach ==
Vessels with a draft of more than 14 metres should use the IJgeul.

To protect access to the channel jetties were built in the sea.

In 1957 the Waterloopkundig Laboratorium began research for the best solution. The result was two jetties with 500 m difference in length between the southern and the northern one. The length of the north pier should be 1500 m to 2500 m and the south jetty of about 3000 m. This is to prevent the silting of the entrance channel and to ensure that vessels entering suffer less from the prevailing south-west and north–south flow along the coast.

== Locks ==
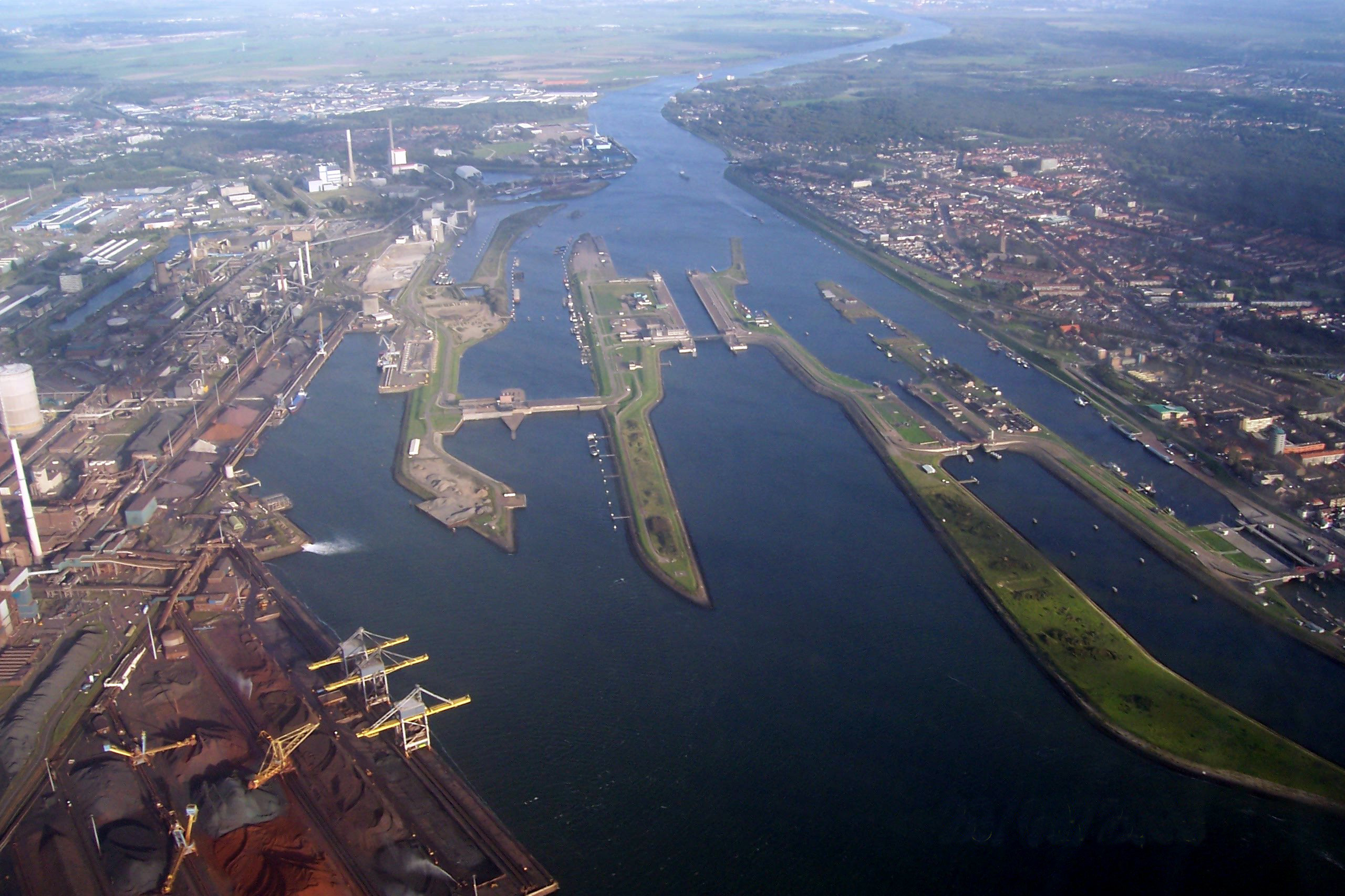
Mouth and locks at the North Sea.

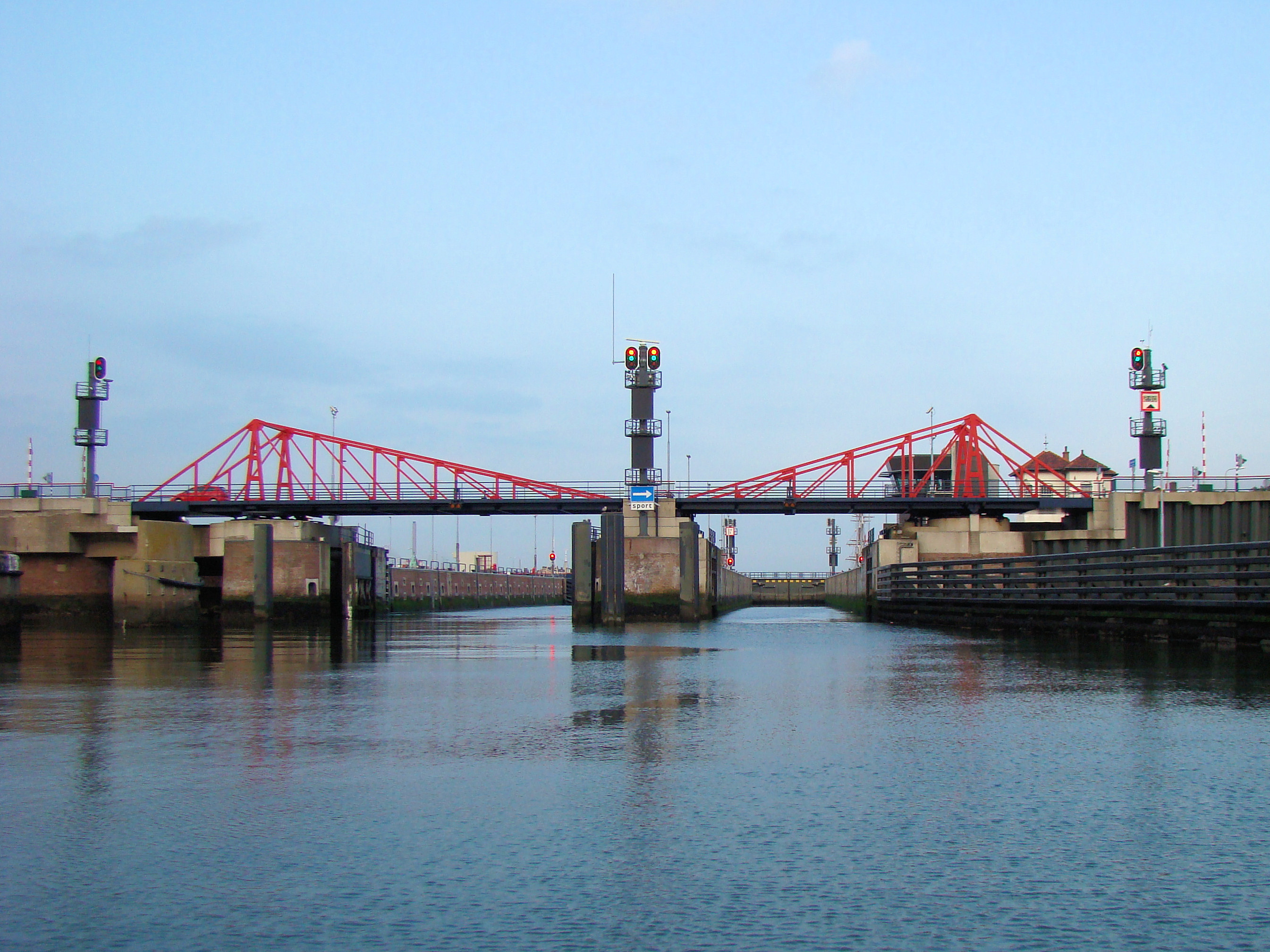
Entrance to the South Locks from sea. Being the oldest locks in the complex, they are now the main passage for recreational vessels and smaller inland ships.

There are four locks, of various sizes at the North Sea mouth of the canal: When the north canal lock was opened in 1929 it was the largest canal lock in the world.

name	completed	dimensions (L x W x D) meters	dimensions (L x W x D) feet
South	1876	110 x 20 x 8	360 x 65 x 26
Small	1876	110 x 11 x 3.5	360 x 36 x 11
Middle	1896	225 x 25 x 10	738 x 82 x 33
North	1929	400 x 50 x 15	1312 x 164 x 49
New sealock	2019	500 x 70 x 18	1640 x 230 x 59

== Crossings ==
Railway and metro tunnels (with nearest station on the south and north bank):

- between Amsterdam Centraal station and Noorderpark metro station
- between Amsterdam Sloterdijk railway station and Zaandam railway station
- between Driehuis railway station and Beverwijk railway station

Road tunnels, from east to west:

- Zeeburger Tunnel and Zeeburger Bridge (part of the A10 motorway)
- IJ Tunnel
- Coen Tunnel (part of the A10 motorway)
- Wijker Tunnel (part of the A9 motorway)
- Velser Tunnel (part of the A22 motorway)

The most western crossing is the road over the locks. The route depends on which of the locks is closed.

Several ferries. In Amsterdam there are several across the IJ; at least one is frequent, operating 24 hours a day, free of charge.

Bicyclists may only cross the canal at the locks in IJmuiden or at the Schellingwouderbrug, a bridge in the very east of Amsterdam or via ferries. Tunnels for bicyclists still do not exist.
