= Nieuwesluis =

Nieuwesluis is the name of two Dutch villages:

- Nieuwesluis, North Holland
- Nieuwesluis, Zeeland

== See also ==
- Nieuwe Sluis, a lighthouse in Nieuwesluis, Zeeland
- Nieuwersluis, a village in Utrecht
