= De Cocksdorp =

- Village
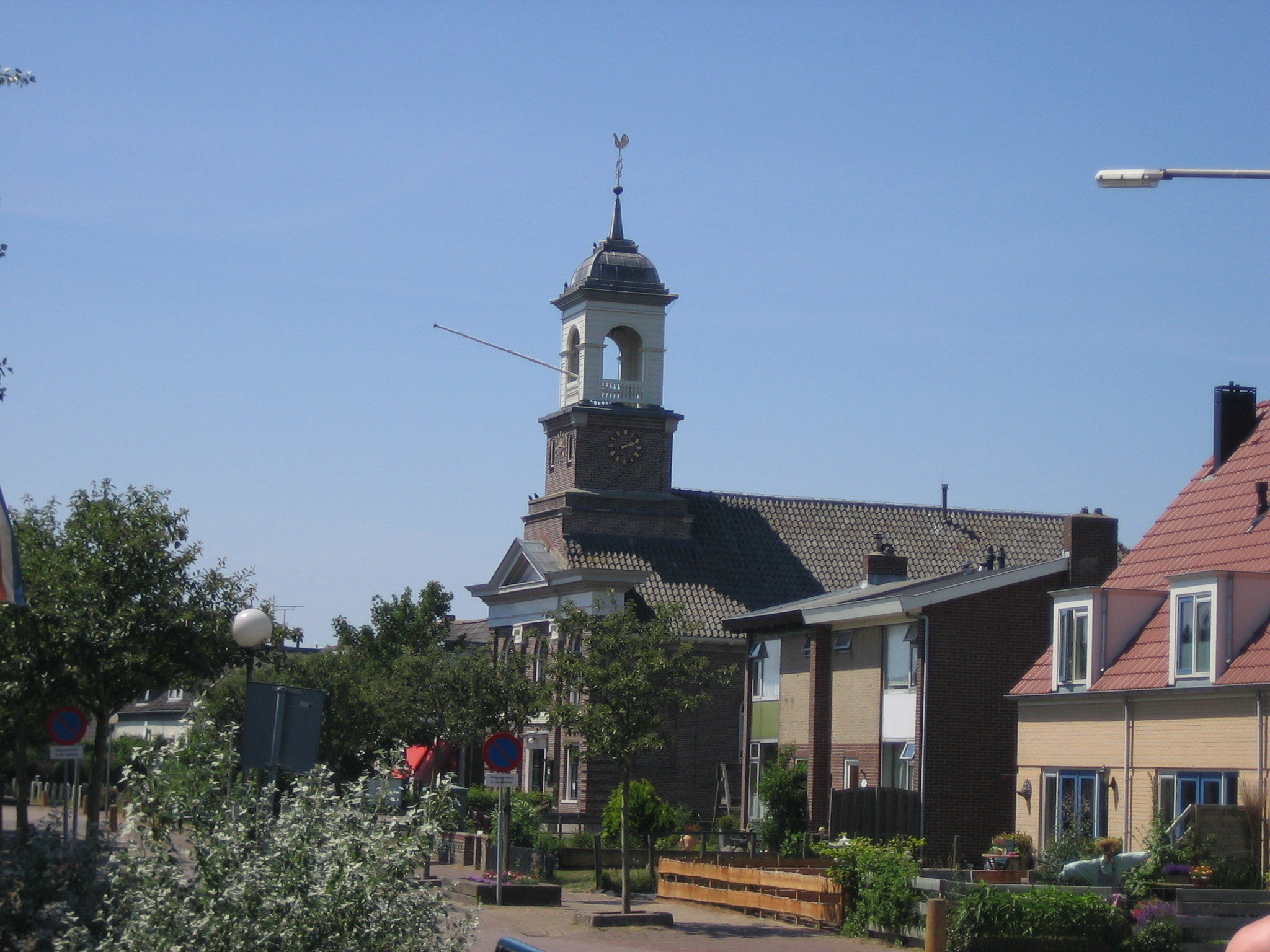

- Location in the Netherlands Location in the province of North Holland in the Netherlands
- Coordinates: 53°9′N 4°52′E
- Country: Netherlands
- Province: North Holland
- Municipality: Texel

Area
  - Total: 1.05 km^{2} (0.41 sq mi)
- Elevation: 1.0 m (3.3 ft)

Population (2025)
  - Total: 545
  - Density: 519/km^{2} (1,340/sq mi)
- Time zone: UTC+1 (CET)
  - Summer (DST): UTC+2 (CEST)
- Postal code: 1795
- Dialing code: 0222

De Cocksdorp (Dutch pronunciation: [də ˈkɔksdɔr(ə)p]) is a village town in the Dutch province of North Holland. It is a part of the municipality of Texel, and lies about 25 km north of Den Helder. It is the newest village on the island.

== History ==
De Cocksdorp is a road village which developed on the north of island shortly after the poldering of Eierland in 1835. In 1836, it was named after Nicolas Joseph de Cock after the main merchant who initiated the poldering. The village was built around a harbour.

The Dutch Reformed church is a neoclassic aisleless church with large pilasters built between 1839 and 1841. The Catholic St Francisca Romana Church is single aisled Renaissance Revival church built between 1875 and 1877. It was damaged in 1945, and restored between 1949 and 1950.

De Cocksdorp is located near the most dangerous parts of the sea where numerous ships have been lost. In 1864, a lighthouse was built. It was damaged during the Georgian uprising in 1945 and restored between 1948 and 1949. The lighthouse is 35 metres (115 ft) tall.

== Gallery ==
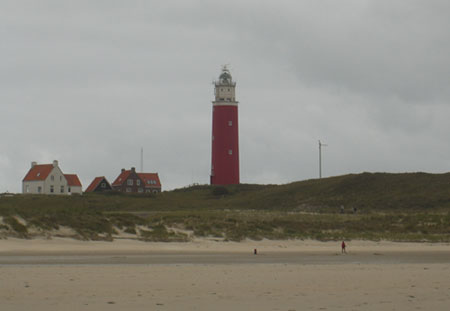
Lighthouse

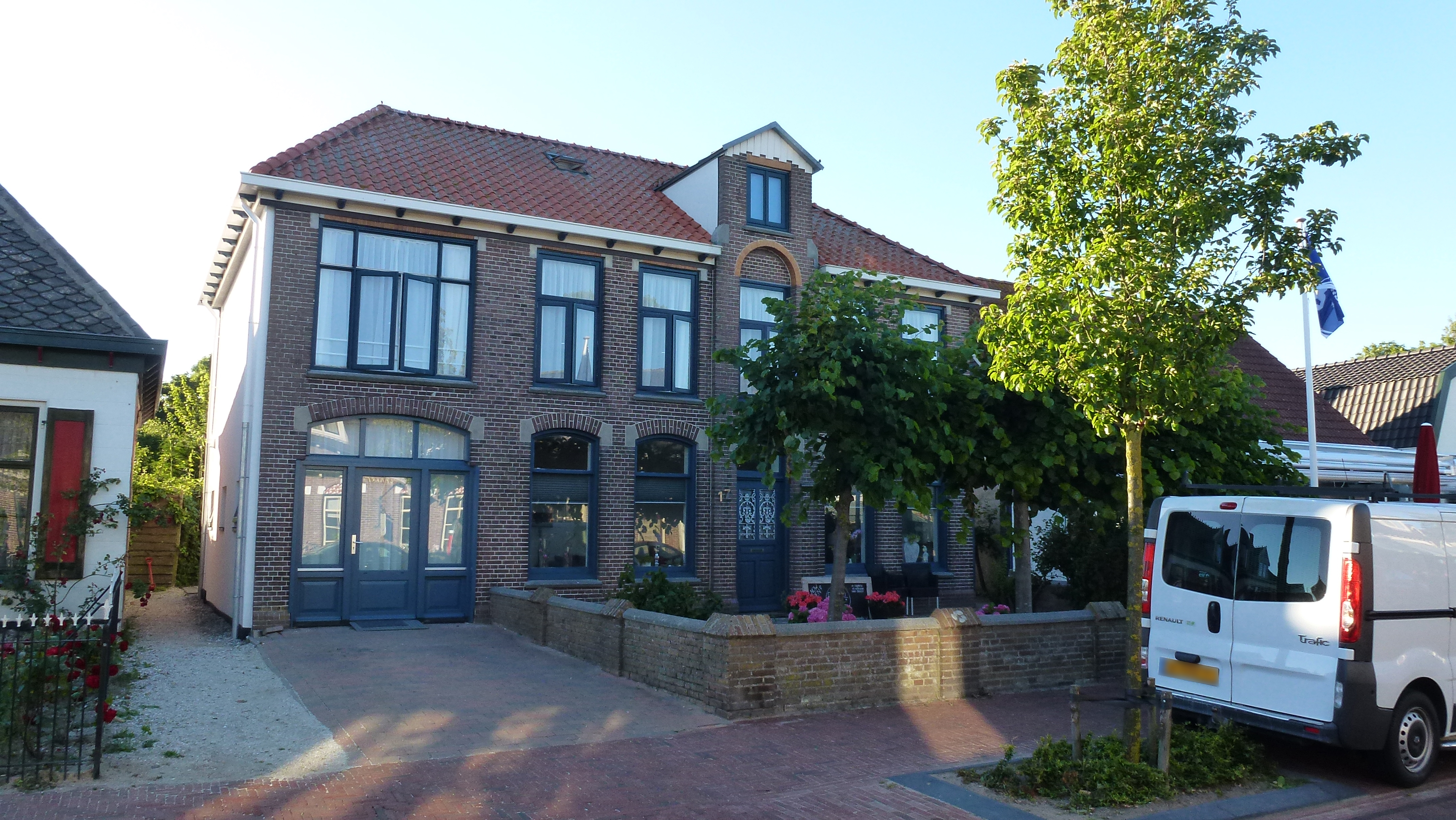
House in De Cocksdorp

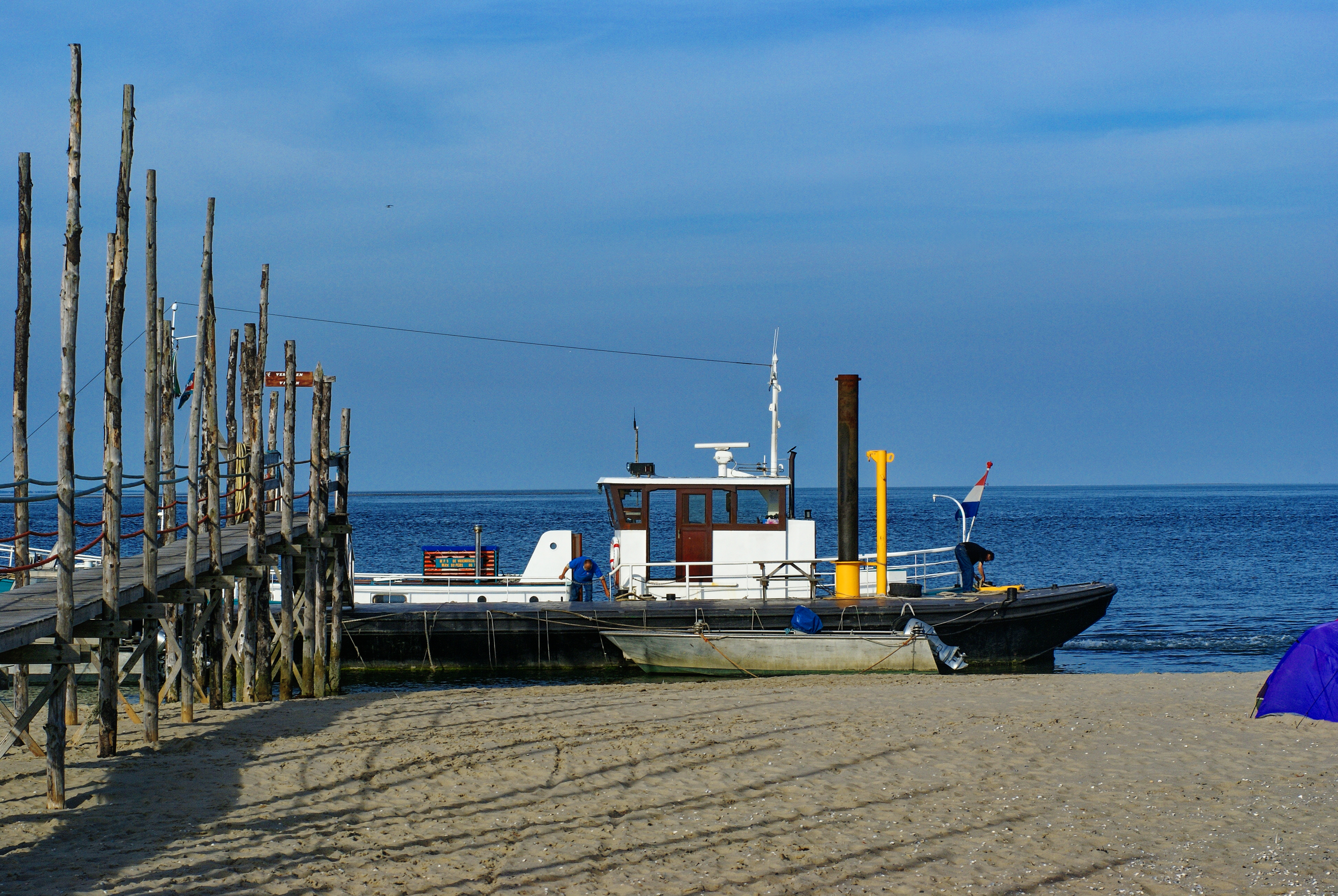
Harbour

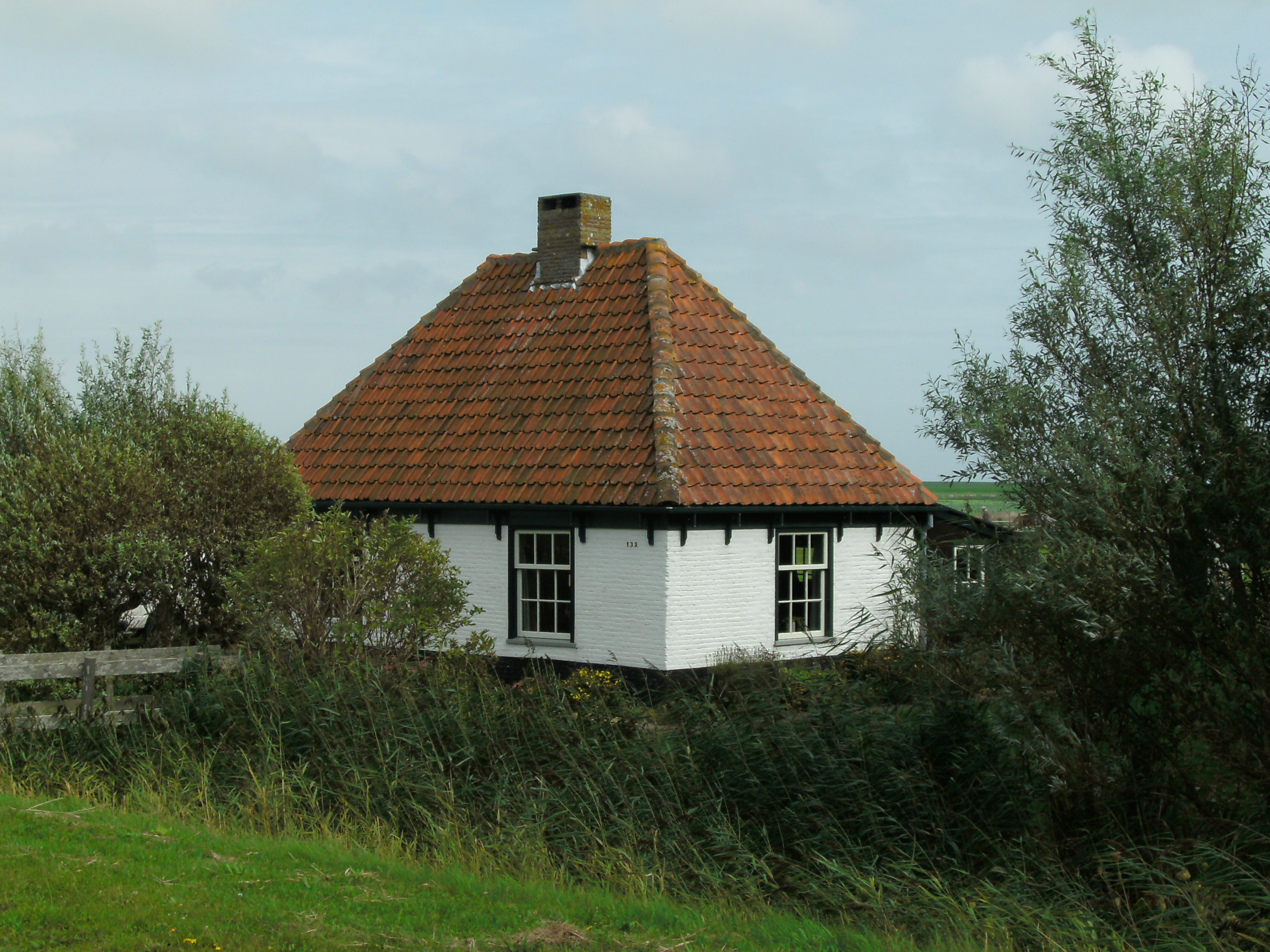
House in De Cocksdorp
