= Vuurduin =

Vuurduin Lighthouse Vlieland
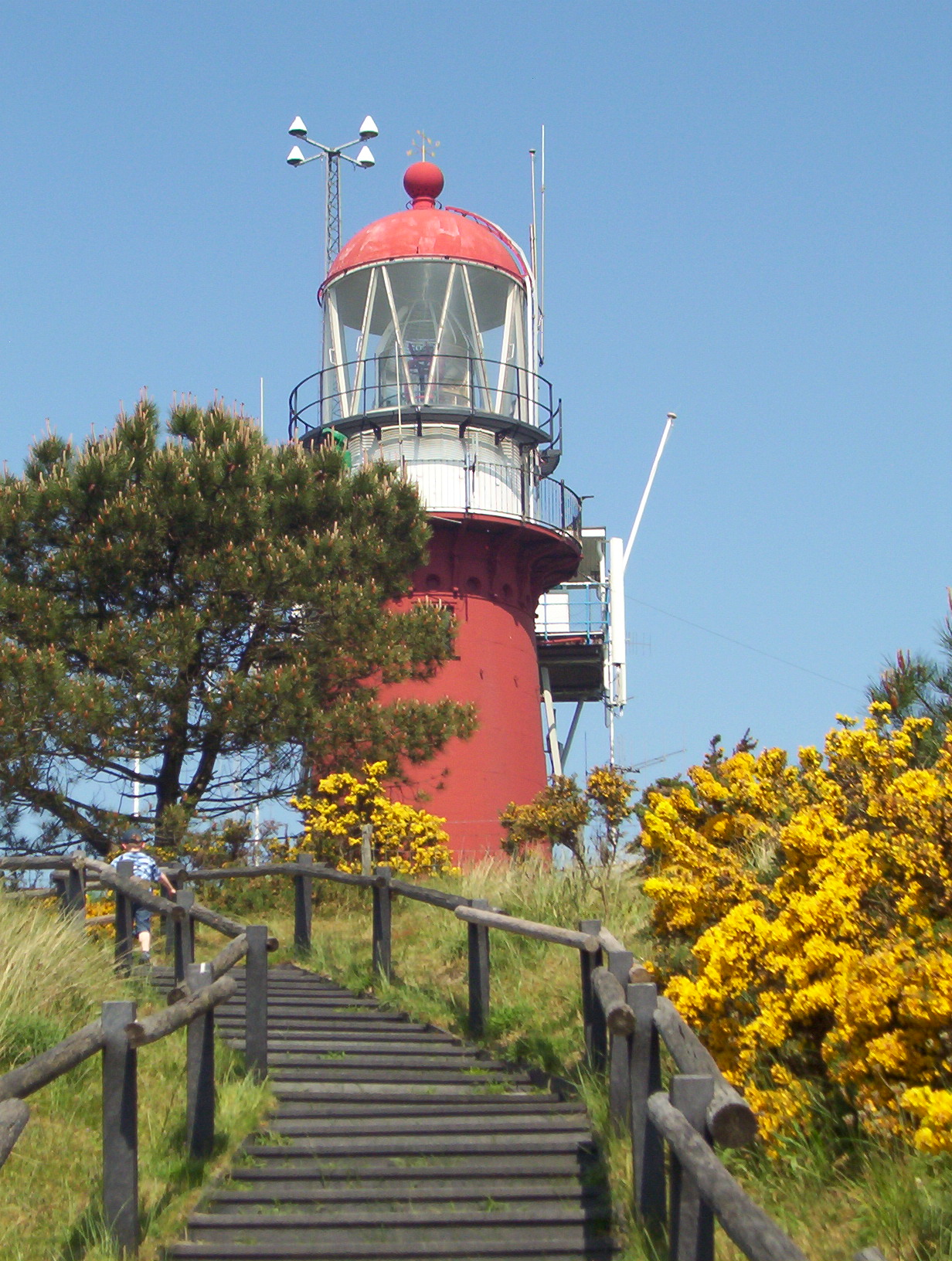
- Vuurduin
- Location: Vlieland, Netherlands
- Coordinates: 53°17′45″N 5°03′30″E

Tower
- Constructed: 1836 (first)
- Construction: cast iron tower
- Height: 16.8 metres (55 ft)
- Shape: cylindrical tower with balcony and lantern
- Markings: red tower and dome, white lantern
- Heritage: Rijksmonument

Light
- First lit: 1909 (current)
- Focal height: 54 metres (177 ft)
- Intensity: 1,000,000 cd
- Range: 20 nautical miles (37 km)
- Characteristic: isophase light, 4 sec
- Netherlands no.: NL-2066

Vuurduin is a lighthouse on the Dutch island Vlieland. The tower is the top part of the former front light of the leading lights in IJmuiden, designed by Quirinus Harder.

The lighthouse was placed on Vlieland in 1909, on top of one of the Vuurboetsduin, one of the highest sand dunes (at 45 metres) in the Netherlands. A lookout tower was built next to the lighthouse in 1929. In 1986, the cupola was renovated. While a lighthouse keeper still attends, the lighthouse is fully automated.

== See also ==
- List of lighthouses in the Netherlands

== Gallery ==
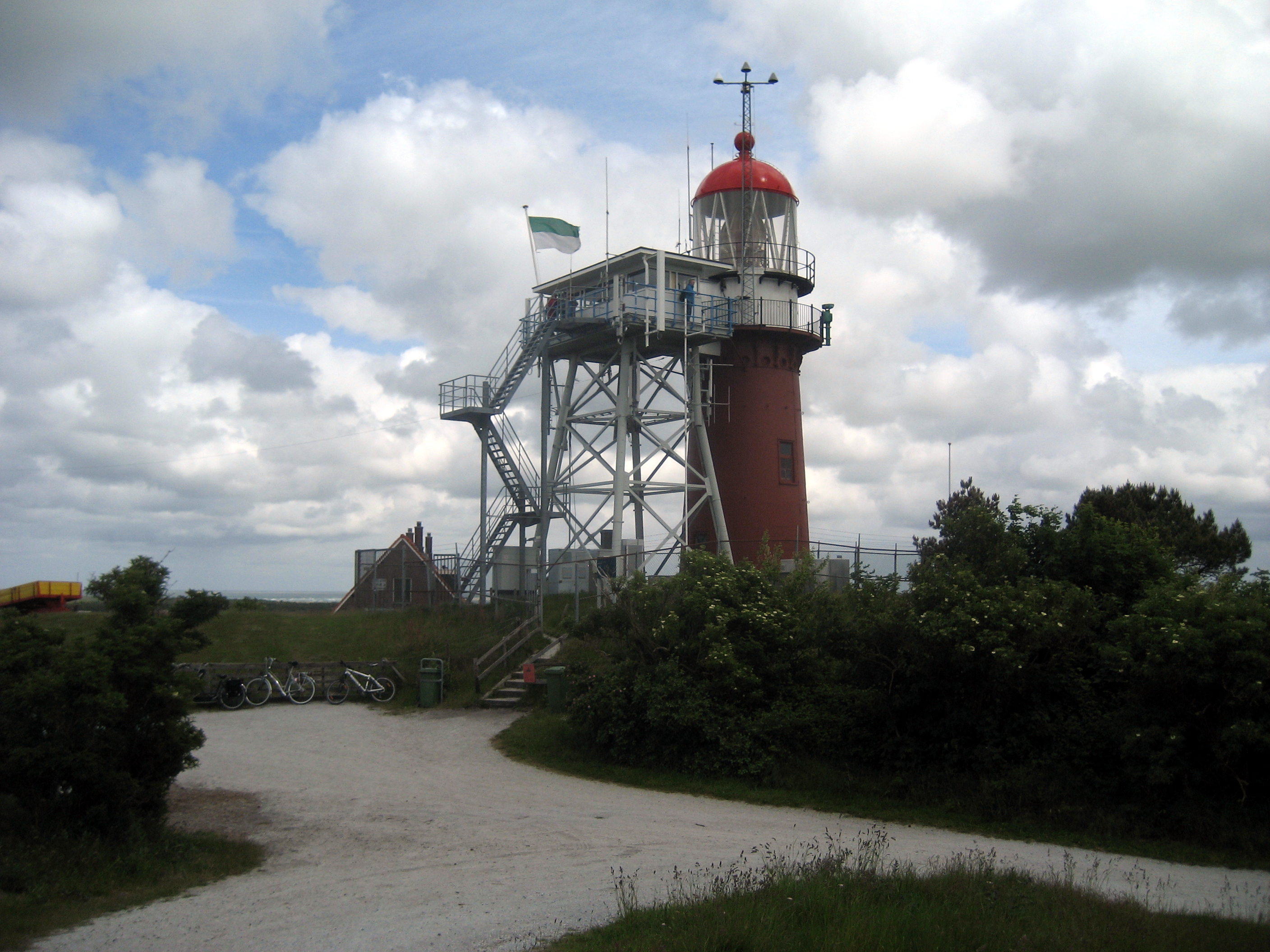
Vuurduin

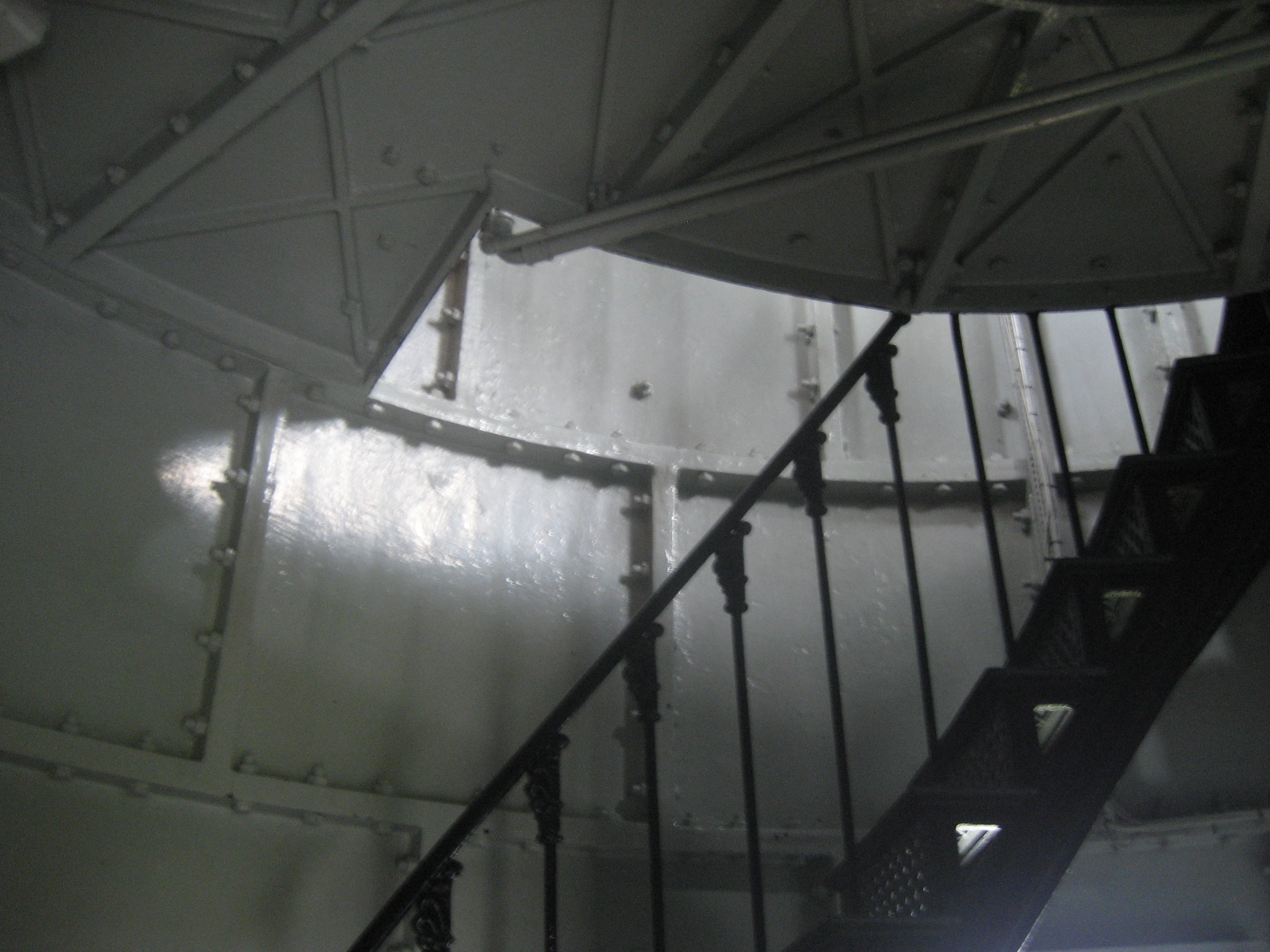
Lighthouse staircase

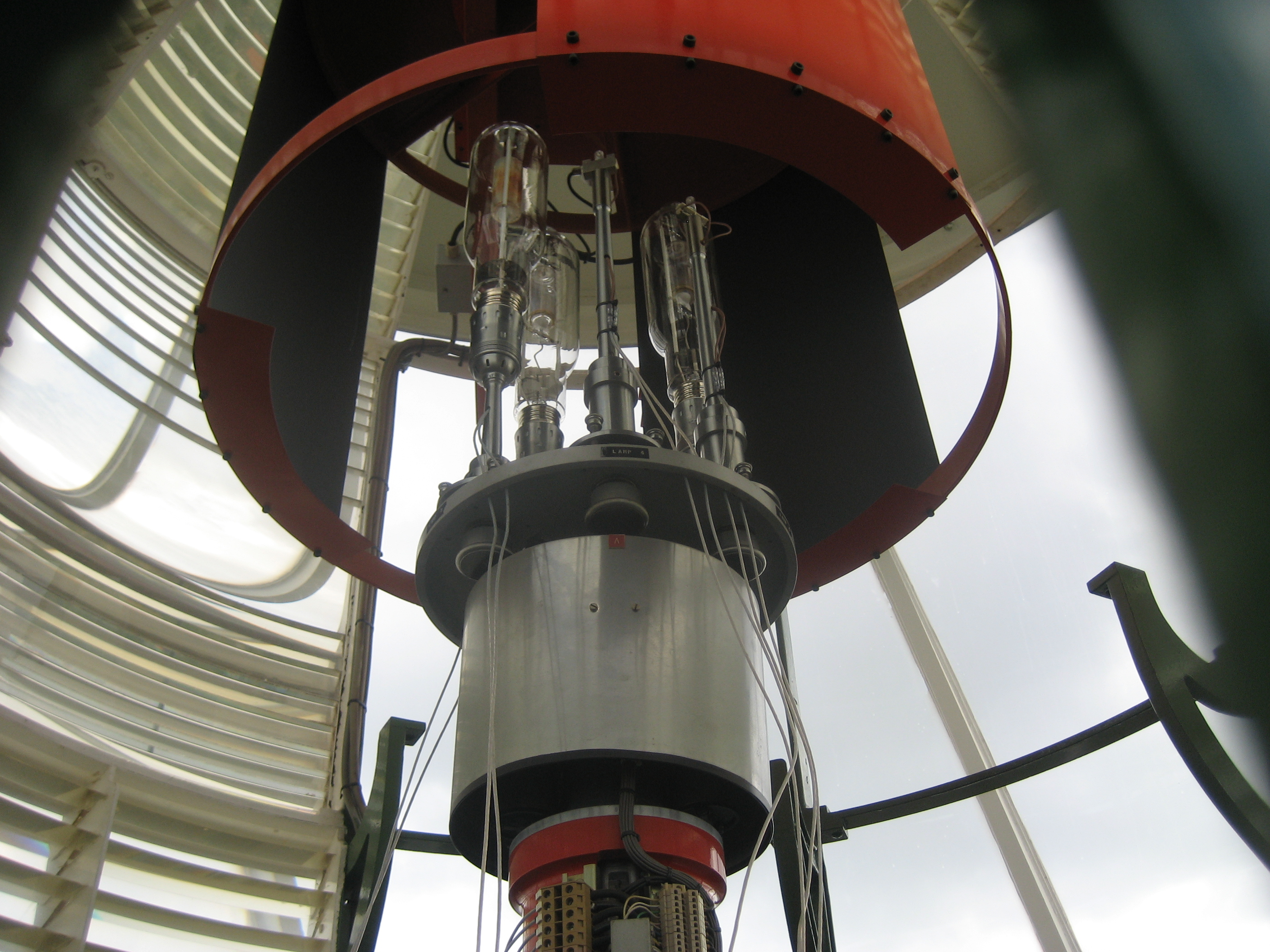
The lights

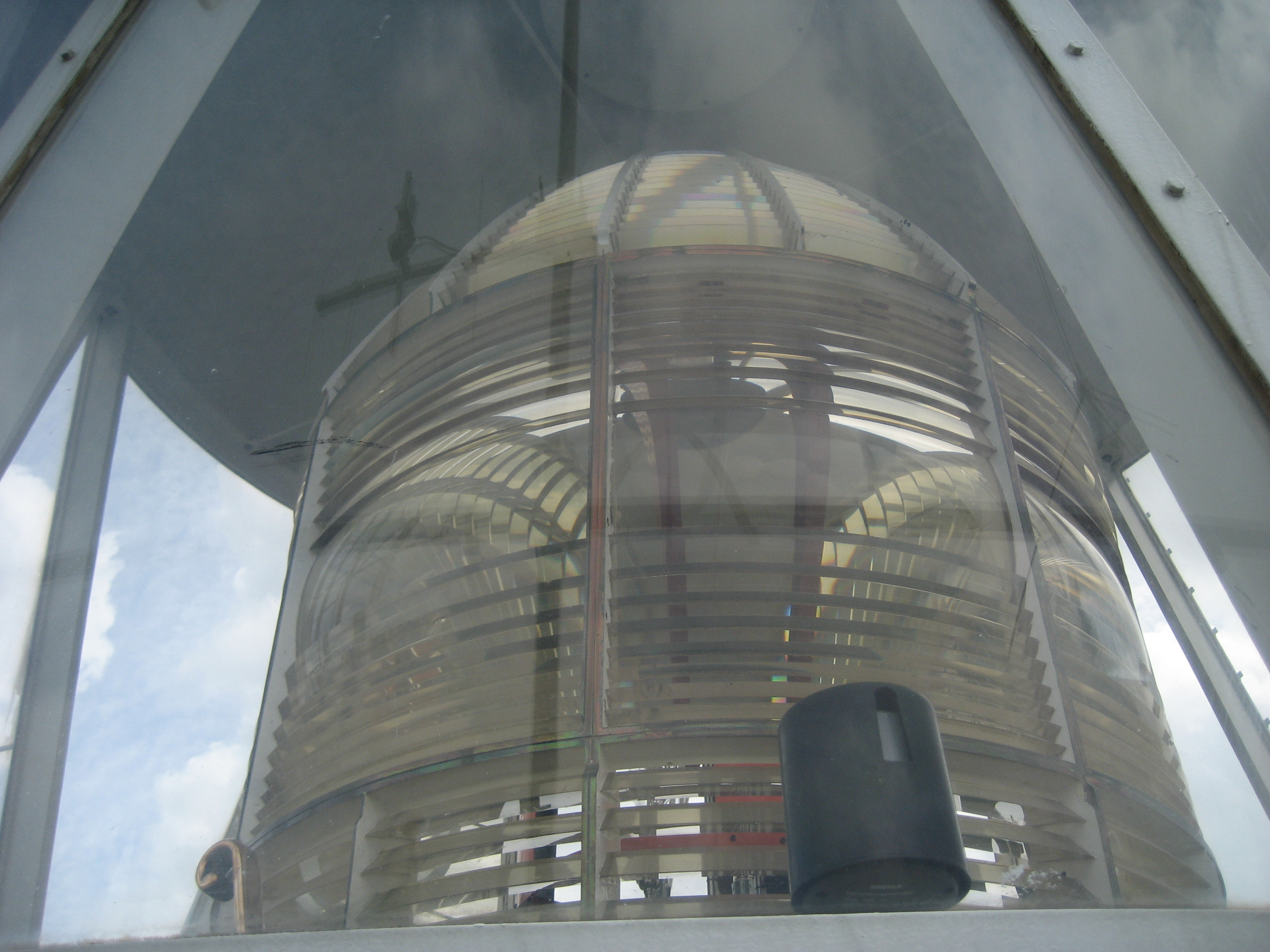
Glass cupola
