= Scheveningen Lighthouse =

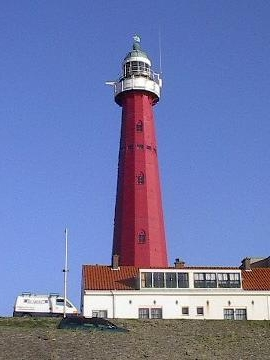
- Scheveningen Lighthouse
- Location: Scheveningen, Netherlands
- Coordinates: 52°6′15″N 4°16′6″E

Tower
- Constructed: 1875
- Construction: cast iron tower
- Height: 30 metres (98 ft)
- Shape: dodecagonal prism tower with balcony and gallery
- Markings: red tower, white balcony and lantern, green lantern dome
- Heritage: Rijksmonument

Light
- First lit: 20 December 1875
- Focal height: 49 metres (161 ft)
- Intensity: 3,800,000 candela
- Range: 29 nautical miles (54 km)
- Characteristic: Fl(2) W 10s
- Netherlands no.: NL-1292

De Scheveningen Lighthouse is a lighthouse in Scheveningen, Netherlands. It was designed by Quirinus Harder and activated finished in 1875.

== History ==
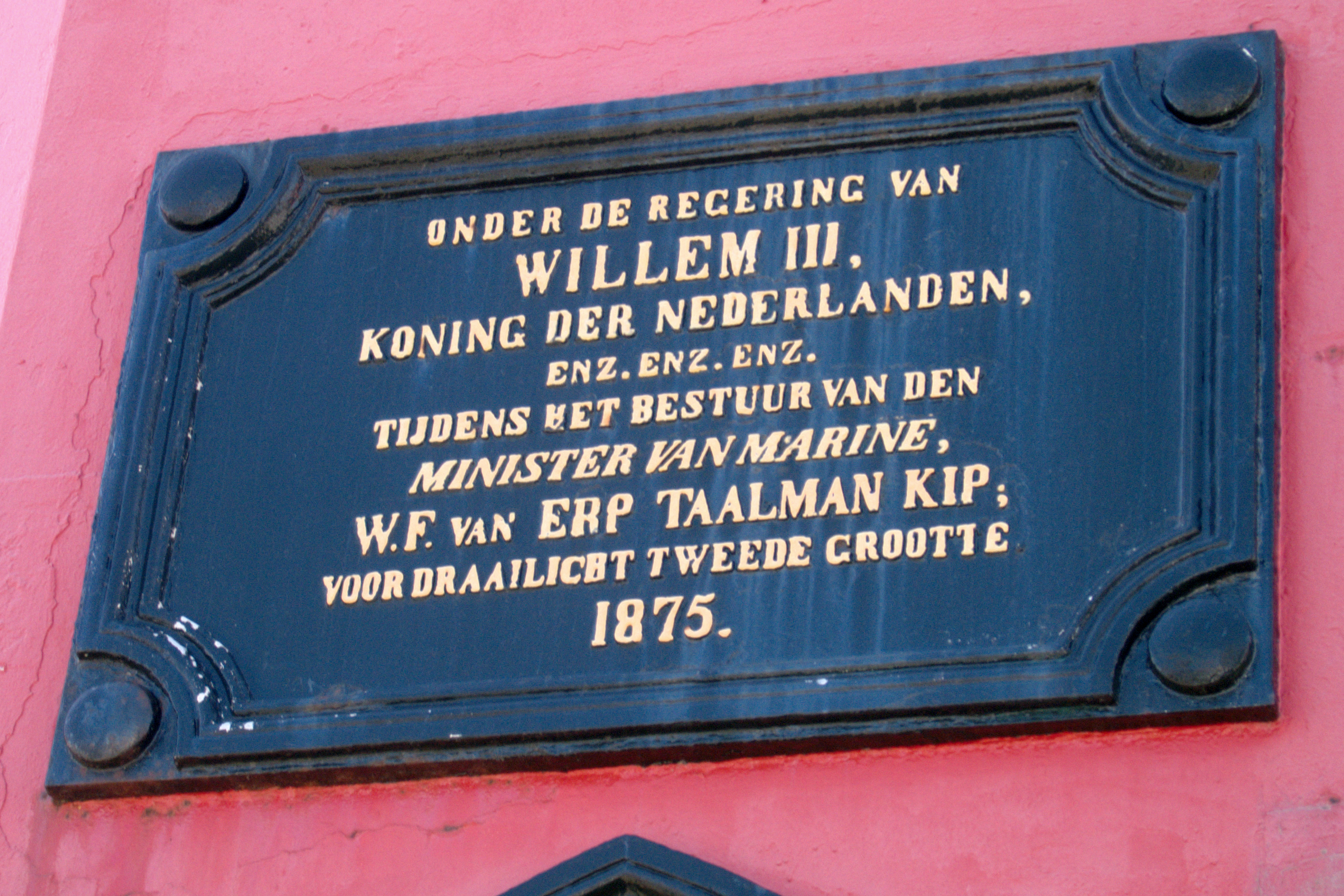
Plaque above entrance

In the 16th century Scheveningen had a lighthouse already, and the church collected money from the ships using it. It was elevated in 1850, and equipped with a copper cupola and a new light. In the 1870s, Dutch lighthouse designer Quirinus Harder got the assignment for a new lighthouse.

The lighthouse is made of cast iron and consists of nine segments. At the foot of the tower is one house for the supervisor and four more for the lighthouse keeper. The original light rotated in a mercury bath, which was replaced in the 1960s by an electrical system.

== See also ==
- List of lighthouses in the Netherlands
- Cast-iron architecture
