= Quirinus Harder =

Dutch architect (1801–1880)

Quirinus Johan Harder (13 October 1801, in Rotterdam – 21 October 1880, in Vlissingen) was a Dutch architect best known for having designed a large number of lighthouses. He worked as a structural engineer for the Loodswezen, the Dutch organization overseeing all maritime pilots. Harder's lighthouses were made of cast iron, a new material at the time, which allowed for segmented fabrication and construction.

== List of Harder's lighthouses ==
- Eierland Lighthouse (Texel, 1864)
- Nieuwe Sluis (1867)
- Scheveningen Lighthouse (1875)
- Short lighthouse of Westkapelle (1875)
- Lange Jaap (Den Helder, 1877-1878)
- Lage vuurtoren van IJmuiden (1878)
- Hoge vuurtoren van IJmuiden (1878)
- Bornrif (Ameland, 1880-1881)
- Den Oever Lighthouse (1884)
- Stavoren Lighthouse (1884)
- Vuurduin (Vlieland, 1909)

== See also ==
- List of lighthouses in the Netherlands
