= Duinen van Texel National Park =

National park in the Netherlands

Duinen van Texel Nationaal Park
- Nationaal Park Duinen van Texel
- IUCN category II (national park)
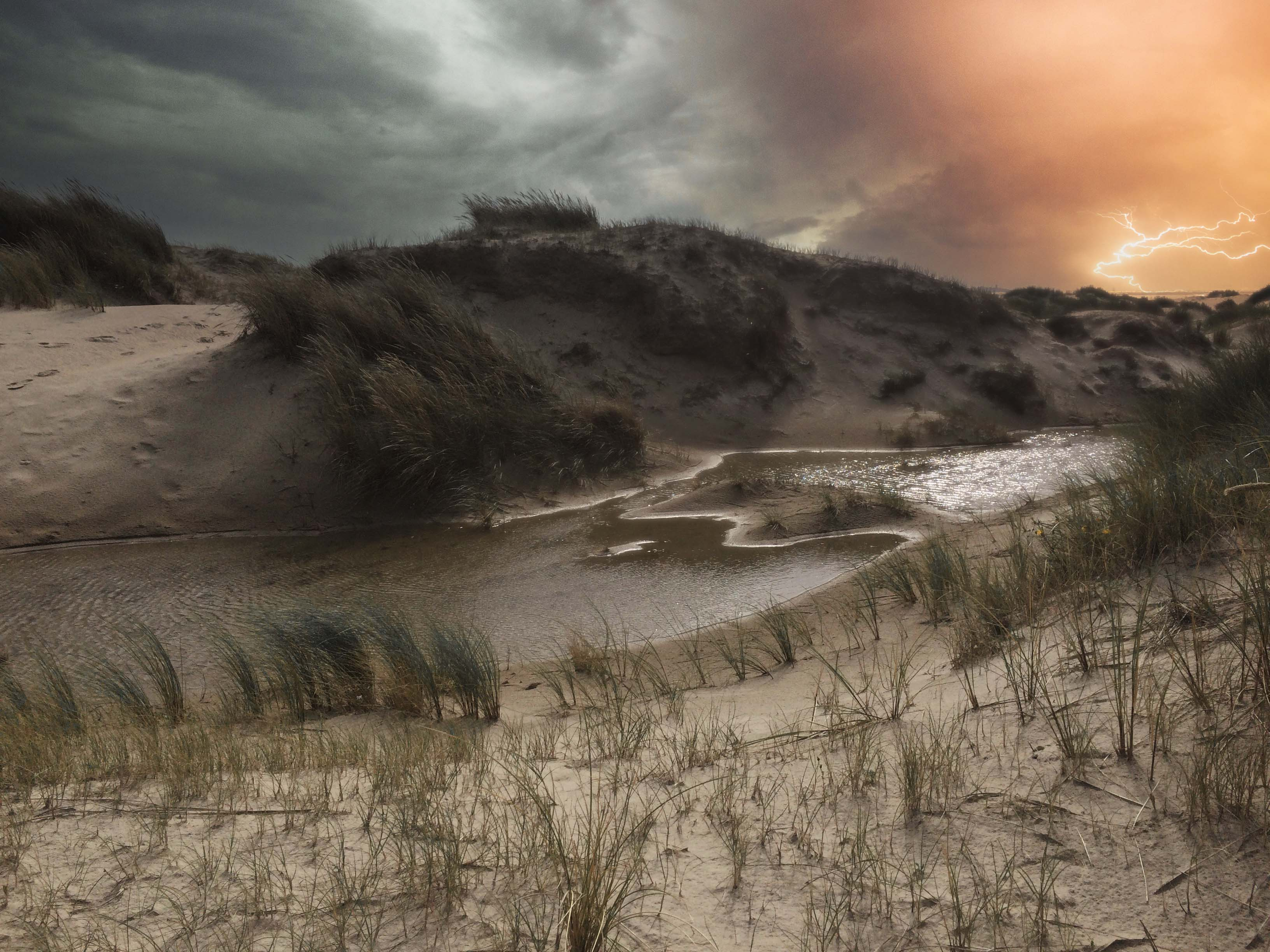
- De Hors in National Park Duinen van Texel

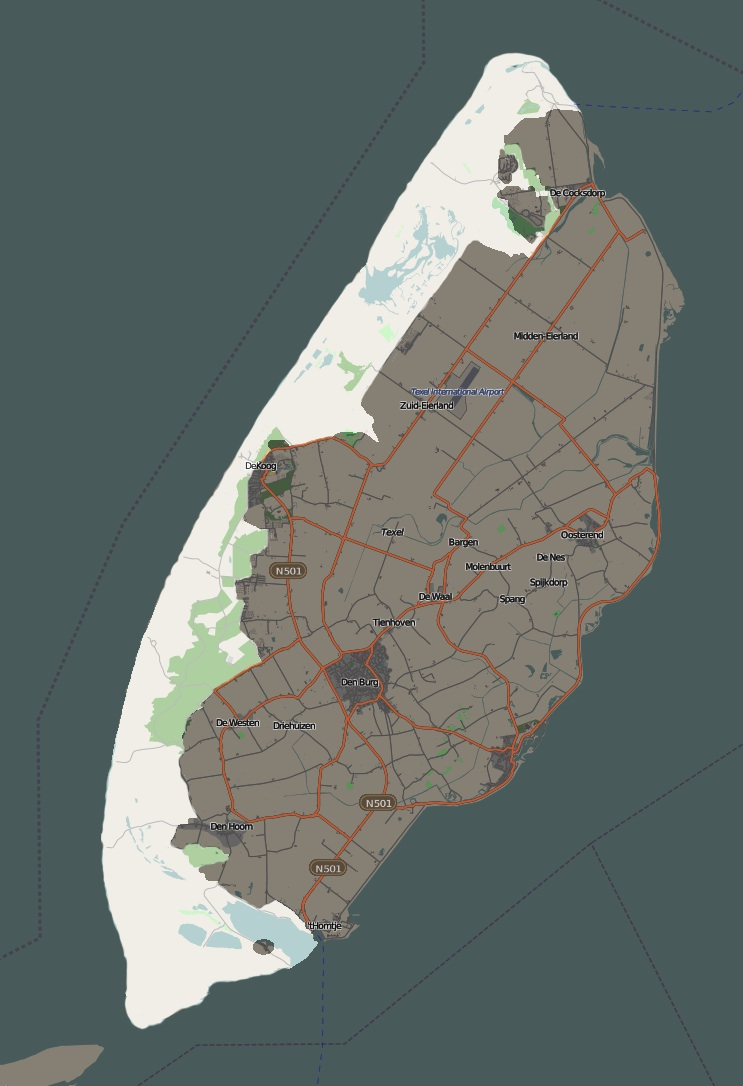
- Map of the National Park
- Location: North Holland, Netherlands
- Coordinates: 53°8′N 4°48′E
- Area: 43 km^{2} (17 sq mi)
- Established: 2002
- Governing body: Staatsbosbeheer & Dutch Ministry of Defence
- Website: www.npduinenvantexel.nl

Ramsar Wetland
- Official name: Duinen en Lage Land Texel
- Designated: 29 August 2000
- Reference no.: 2213

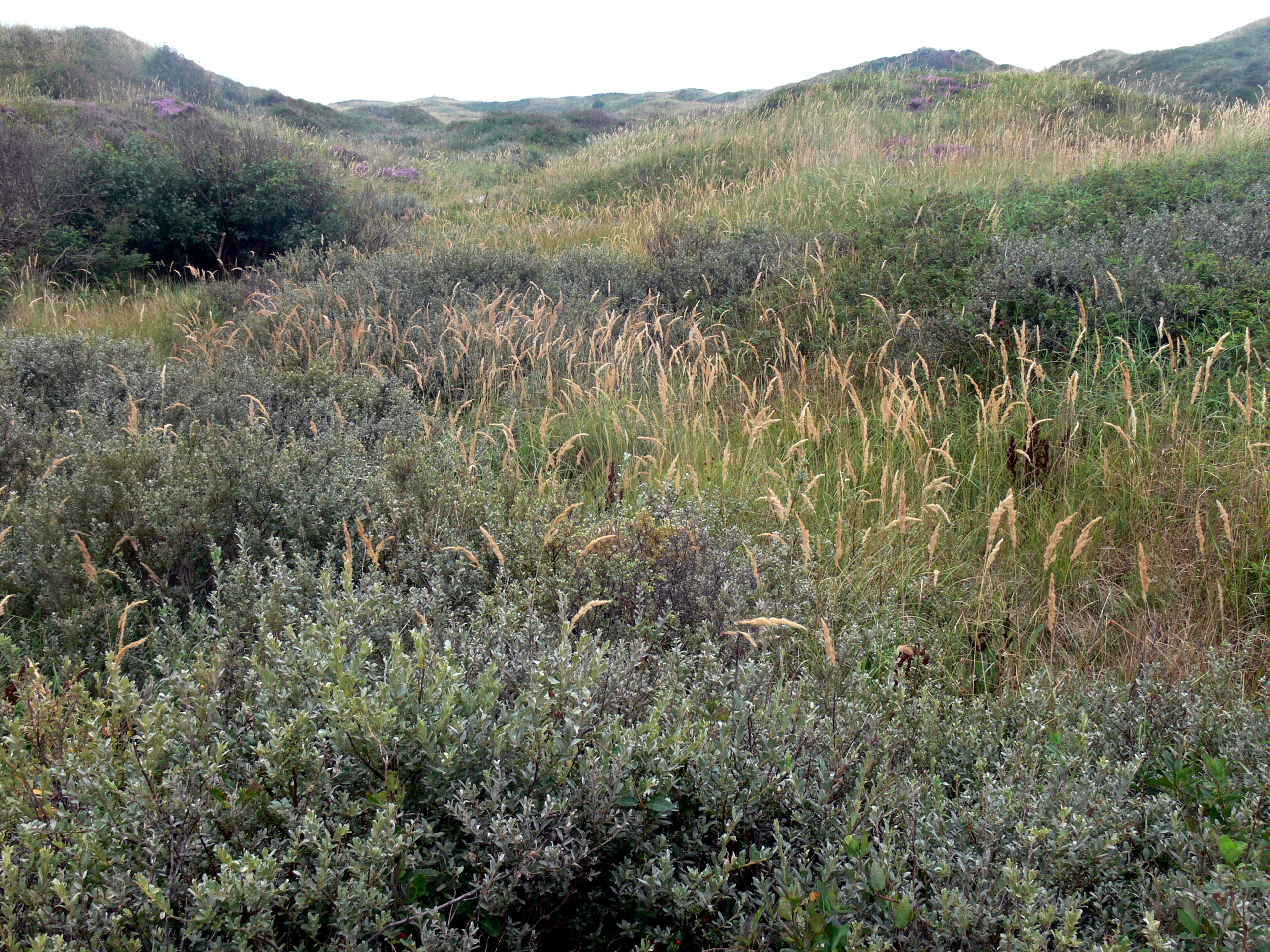
Texel Dunes

Duinen van Texel National Park (duinen = dunes) is a national park located on the North Holland island of Texel in the Netherlands. All dune systems on the western side of the island and the large coastal plains on both the northern and southern points of the island are part of the park. The park covers approximately 43 km^{2} (17 sq mi) and attained national park status in 2002. The visitor center is located in the natural history museum Ecomare.

In 1927 botanist Jac. P. Thijsse made an illustrated book about the flora and fauna on the island, and pointed out the major environmental values of the island. This book was one of a series, the book was cheap, and the pictures for the book came free with each Verkade chocolate bar.

There are many walking trails which follow either red, yellow, blue or green signs, the green routes are not accessible during the bird breeding season. Many bicycle trails cross the park as well.

== Areas ==
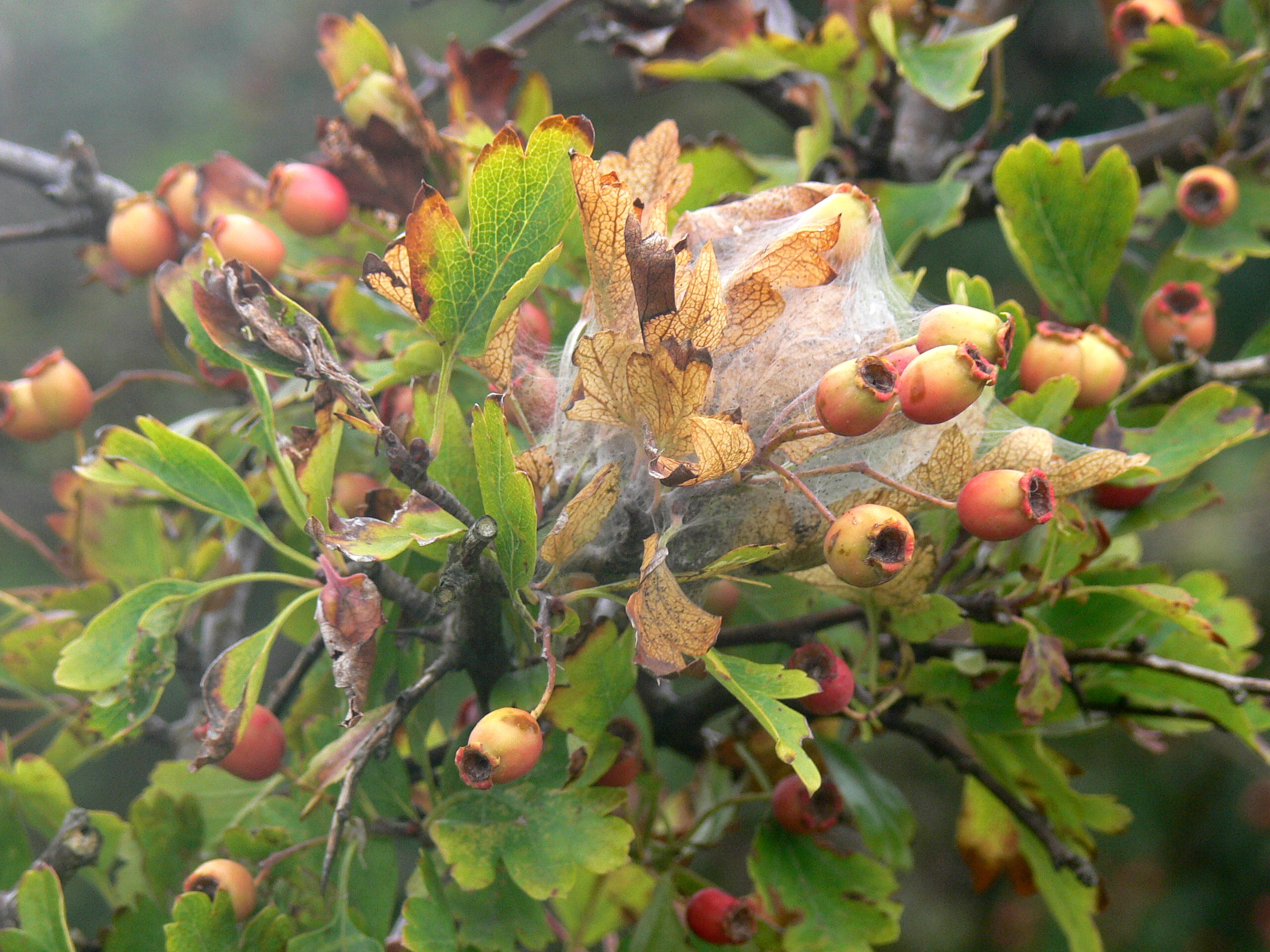
Sea-Buckthorn near Ecomare

From south to north the park comprises the following areas:

- De Hors
- De Geul
- De Mok
- De Bollekamer
- De Westerduinen
- De Dennen
- Het Duinpark
- Californië-bos
- De Seetingsnollen
- Camping Kogerstrand
- De Muy
- De Slufter
- De Haneplas
- Krimbos
- Eijerlandse Duinen
- Camping de Robbejager

=== De Hors ===
The Hors is at the most southerly point of Texel and is largely owned by the Dutch Ministry of Defence. The terrain is used for amphibious training. The defense complex build on the Mok bay is called de Mok. The southern part of the Hors is a large coastal plain which was formed because in the past shoals "walked" toward the island, the last shoal to do so was Onrust in 1910.

On the plains new dunes are being formed. On the newest dunes "biestarwegras" (Elytrigia juncea subsp. boreoatlantica) is found, and on the somewhat older dunes you will find marram grass. In the moist dune valleys Parnassia, Dactylorhiza and Centaurium have sprung.

The Kreeftenpolder is a dune valley which was formed because a sandbar was built separating it from the coastal plain. The supervisor of the project, Jaap Kreeft gave the polder its name. In the valley the Liparis loeselii and the "armbloemige waterbies" (Eleocharis quinqueflora) grow. Since the year 2000 a large part of it is flooded. On the other side of the sandbar two small lakes have formed, the Horsmeertjes.

=== De Geul ===
The Geul is a wet dune valley, originally it was part of Mok bay, but a dam was built so that drinking water could be extracted from the dunes. Here the largest colony on Texel of common spoonbill breeds. After the extraction of water stopped in 1993 the area became much wetter. Through a ditch with fish ladders, water can escape to the Mok, and three-spined stickleback can enter the Geul from the Wadden Sea. The presence of these fish made the spoonbills decide to breed here. Both highland cattle and Exmoor ponies graze in the area.

=== De Bollekamer ===
The Bollekamer is situated between beach poles 9 and 12, north of Den Hoorn. In the eastern part rocky loam is found very near the surface, this surface does not let water through, therefore this area has the highest groundwater level of the entire dune system. The valleys are influenced by the lime rich groundwater. Highland cattle graze on the Bollekamer.

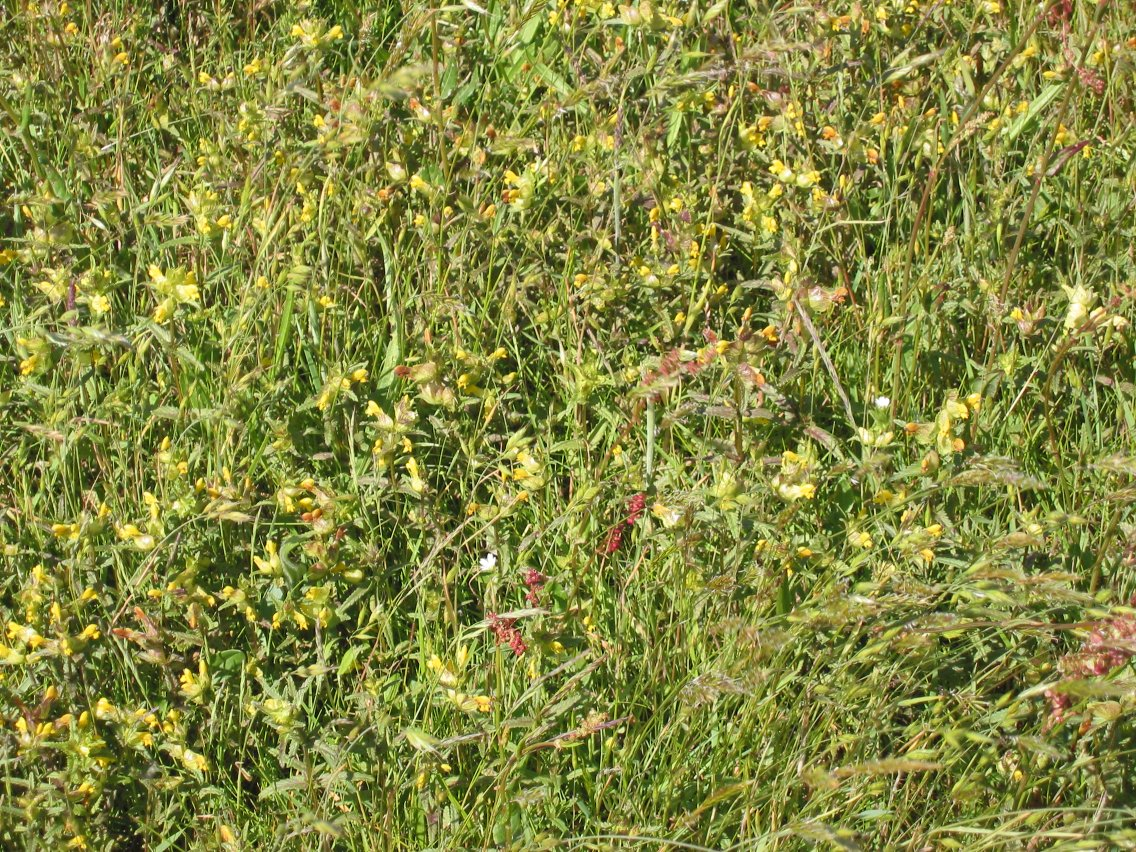
Vegetation in De Nederlanden end of May

=== De Muy ===
The Muy is named after the dune lake that was formed when the North Sea broke through the outer dunes in 1851. This is the oldest known breeding spot for the spoonbill on Texel. In the 1990s the number of spoonbills decreased, while more breeding great cormorants came to the area. De Nederlanden is also part of the Muy, in a land improvement project pastures were made. That area is now managed extensively. Among other plants the Green-winged Orchid grows here.

=== De Slufter ===
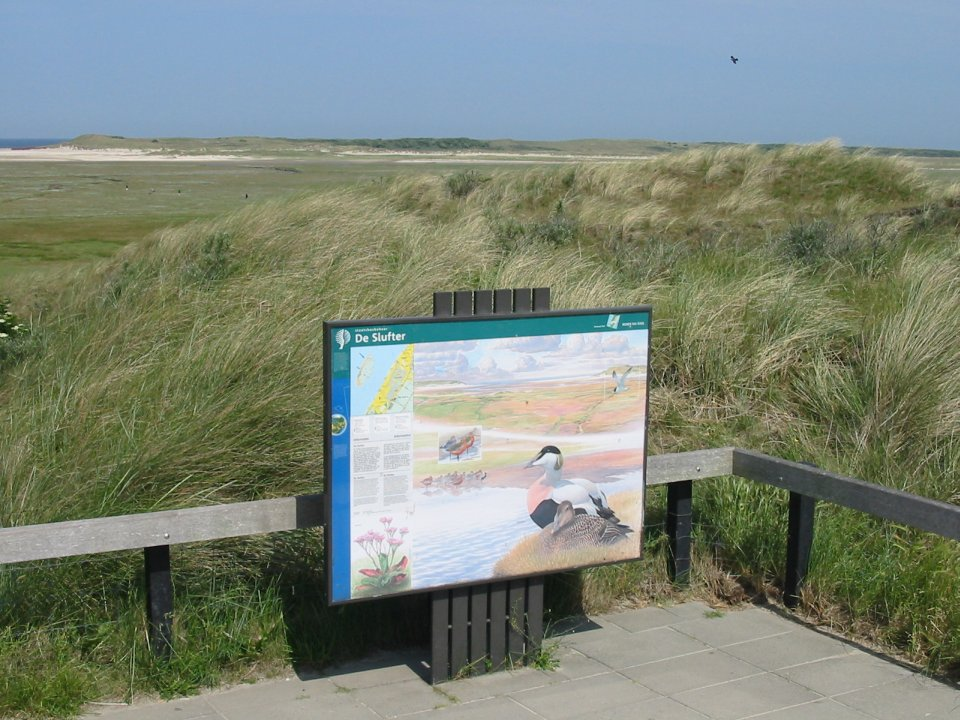
De Slufter

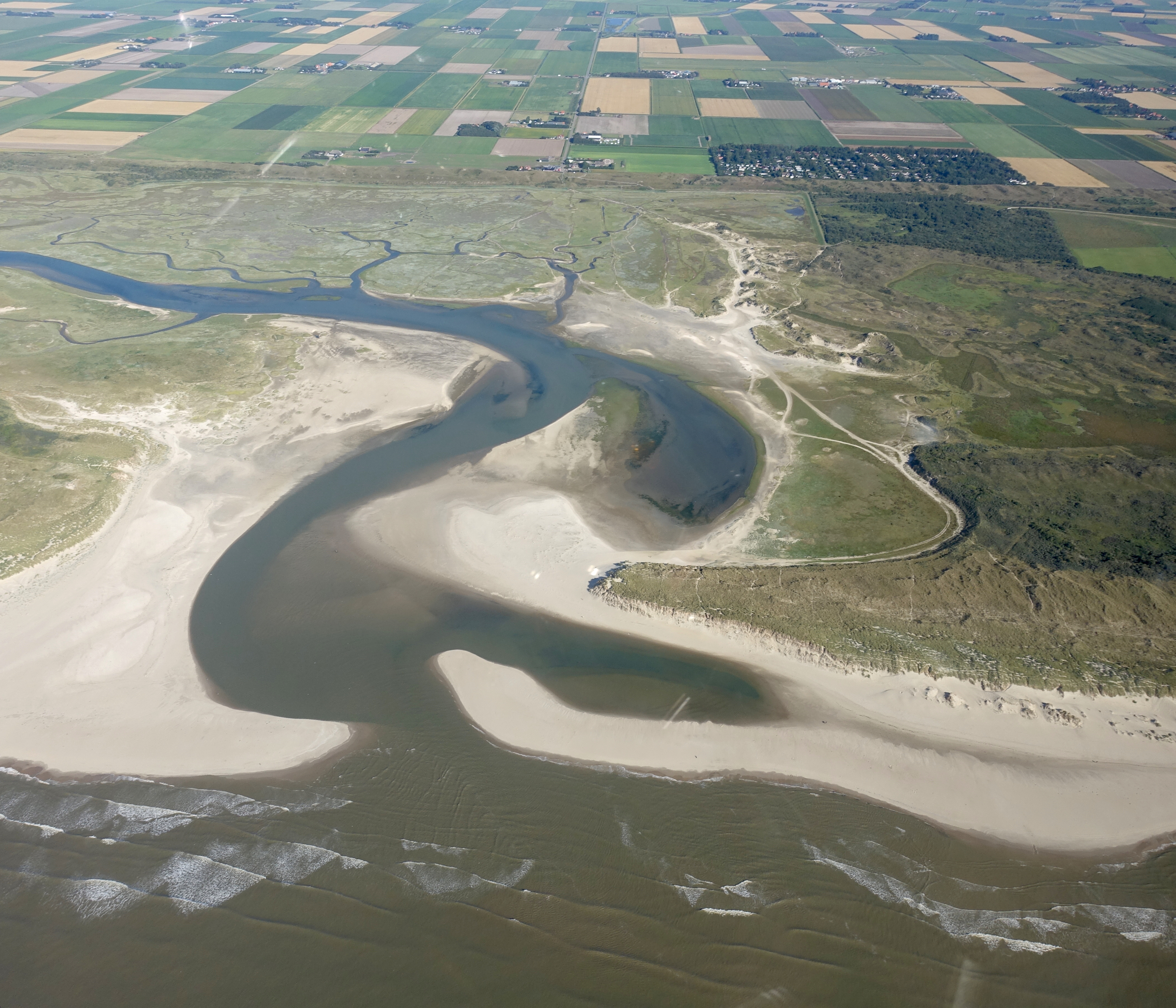
Aerial view of De Slufter

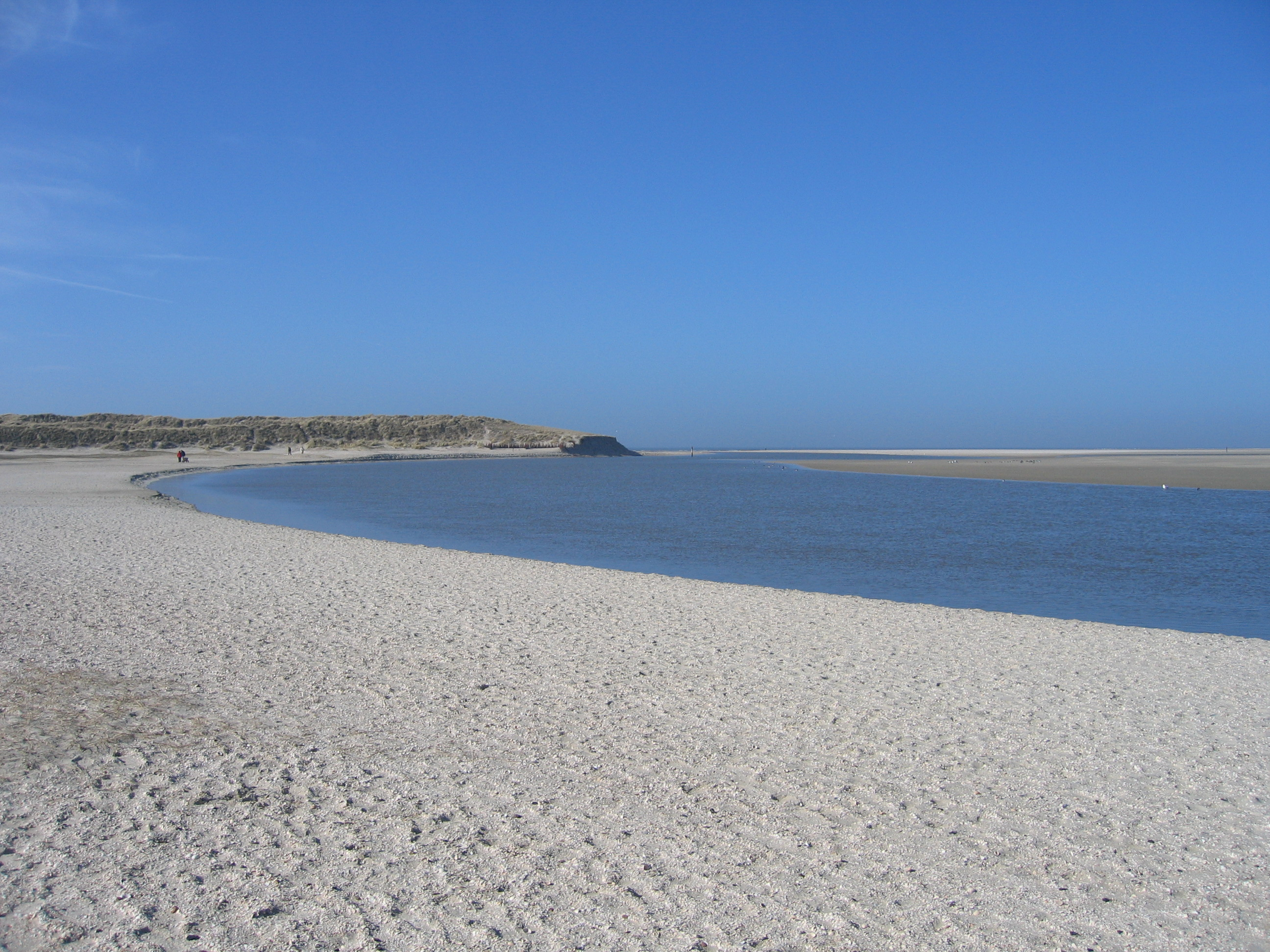
De Slufter

The main part of the Slufter is a wide dune valley which has an open connection to the North Sea through a hole in the outer dunes De Slufter. At high tide seawater streams into the Slufter though creeks and at low tide it streams out again. The large Sluftercreek at the beach is where the water comes through most of the time. Over time the creek has moved in a northern direction. Because this creek was heavily damaging the dunes on the northern side in May 2004, intervention was needed. A new creek was constructed on the far most southern part of the Slufter, and the old creek was closed up a week later. On an average high tide the seawater only gets into the creeks and small lakes, on an extreme high tide the larger part of the Slufter is inundated.

The vegetation consists largely of salt marsh plants. In June the area colors mainly purple because of the Sea-lavender. In October it is mainly red because of the Common glasswort. Sea-buckthorn also grows here.

Many birds visit the Slufter estuary. The common eider breeds here, the spoonbill comes to forage and a variety of waders only enter on a high tide.

Many seashells of the present sea fauna, as well as many fossil seashells dating back to the Eemian Stage wash on to the coastal plain of the Slufter.

The Slufter is separated from the North Sea by two long dune strips, this area is called De Lange Dam. In between the dune stripes there is a valley with fresh water, many orchids grow here.

== Fauna ==
Texel has a very rich variety of species.

=== Birds ===
Commonly sighted birds on the island are: greylag goose, brent goose, shelduck, wigeon, eider, scoter, spoonbill, oystercatcher, pied avocet, golden plover, peewit, knot, dunlin, bar-tailed godwit, common pheasant, european herring gull, lesser black-backed gull, black-headed gull, common tern, sandwich tern, short-eared owl and the hen harrier. Many passerine birds make their home within the dunes, such as starling, northern wheatear, european stonechat, whinchat, white wagtail, western yellow wagtail and meadow pipit.

=== Mammals ===
Within the dunes itself common mammals to be found are rabbits, hares, hedgehogs, various small rodents (mice, voles) and the stoat. The beaches, sandbanks and surrounding waters are home to two species of seal, common seal and grey seal, as well as porpoises.

== Ecomare ==
Ecomare is the park’s natural history museum. It includes a public aquarium and operates as a seal and bird sanctuary. Located in the Island of Texel, Netherlands, it was built in 1930 and had a seal animal shelter added in 1952. It is visited by over 265,000 people a year and is the largest centre for nature information in the Wadden Sea. Ecomare’s stated mission is to improve its visitors’ relationship with coastal and maritime environments, to increase awareness about the fragility of natural resources, and to encourage people to protect them.
