= Stavoren Lighthouse =

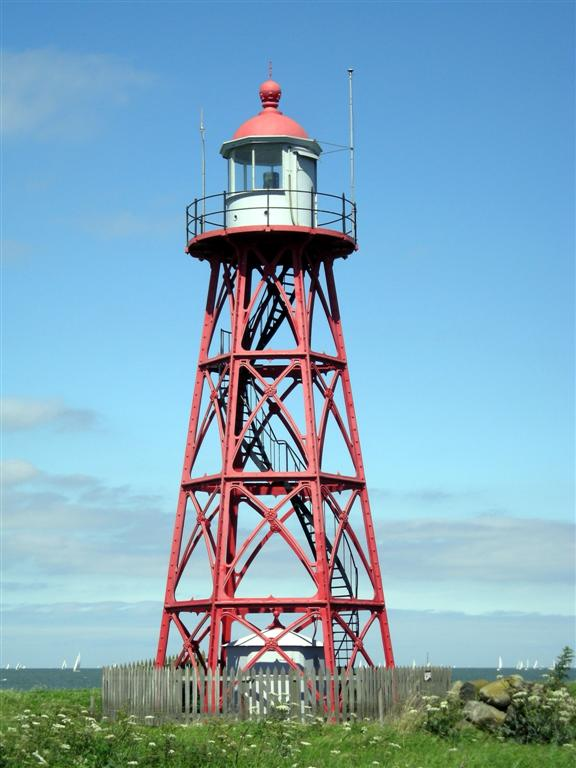
- Stavoren Lighthouse
- Location: Stavoren, Netherlands
- Coordinates: 52°53′17″N 5°21′27.4″E

Tower
- Constructed: 1885
- Construction: cast iron skeletal tower
- Height: 15.7 metres (52 ft)
- Shape: hexagonal pyramidal tower with balcony and lantern
- Markings: red tower and dome, white lantern
- Heritage: Rijksmonument

Light
- Focal height: 15 metres (49 ft)
- Intensity: 3,000 cd
- Range: 12 nautical miles (22 km)
- Characteristic: white light, 2 s on, 2 s off
- Netherlands no.: NL-1996

The Stavoren Lighthouse is a lighthouse near Stavoren on the IJsselmeer, in the Netherlands. On two nearby piers are a red and a green light beacon for the Stavoren harbor. All were built in 1885 (probably by Quirinus Harder) and are Rijksmonuments since 1999. The lighthouse was restored in 2001.

== See also ==
- List of lighthouses in the Netherlands

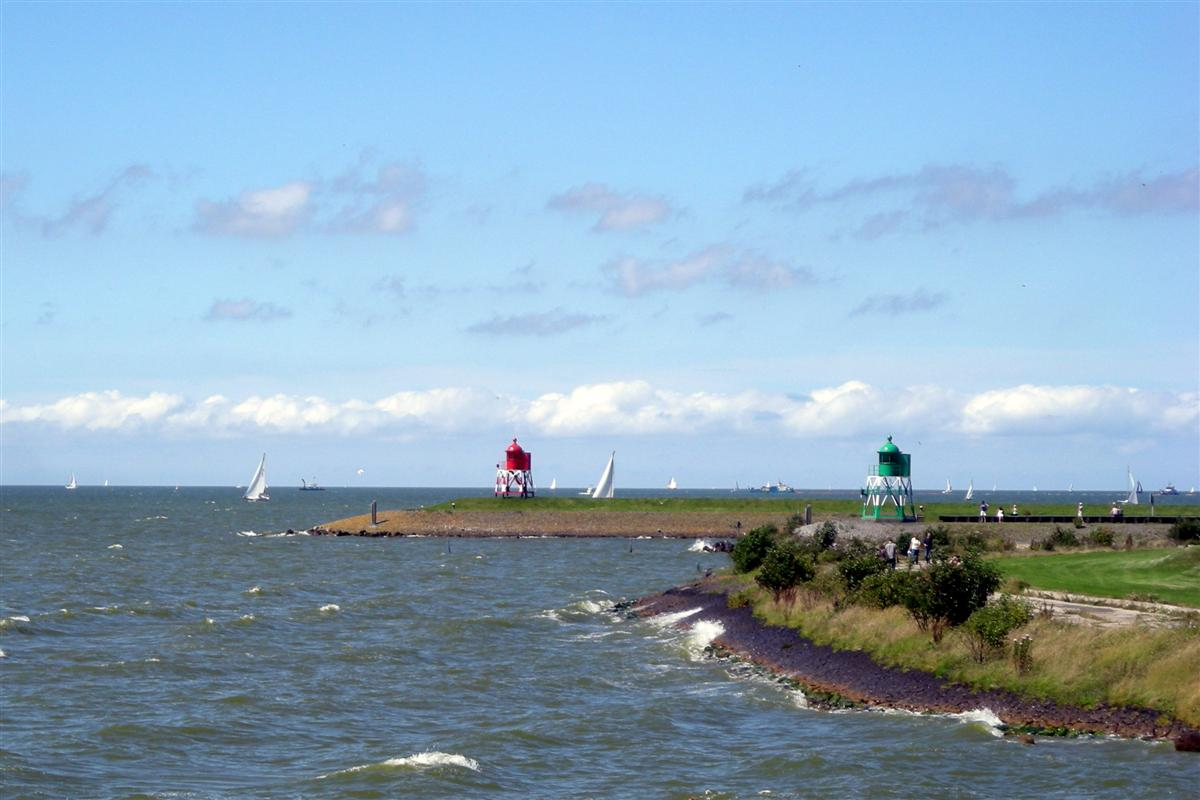
Beacons for Stavoren harbor
