= Eierland =

Former island in Netherlands

Coordinates: 53.16°N 4.84°E

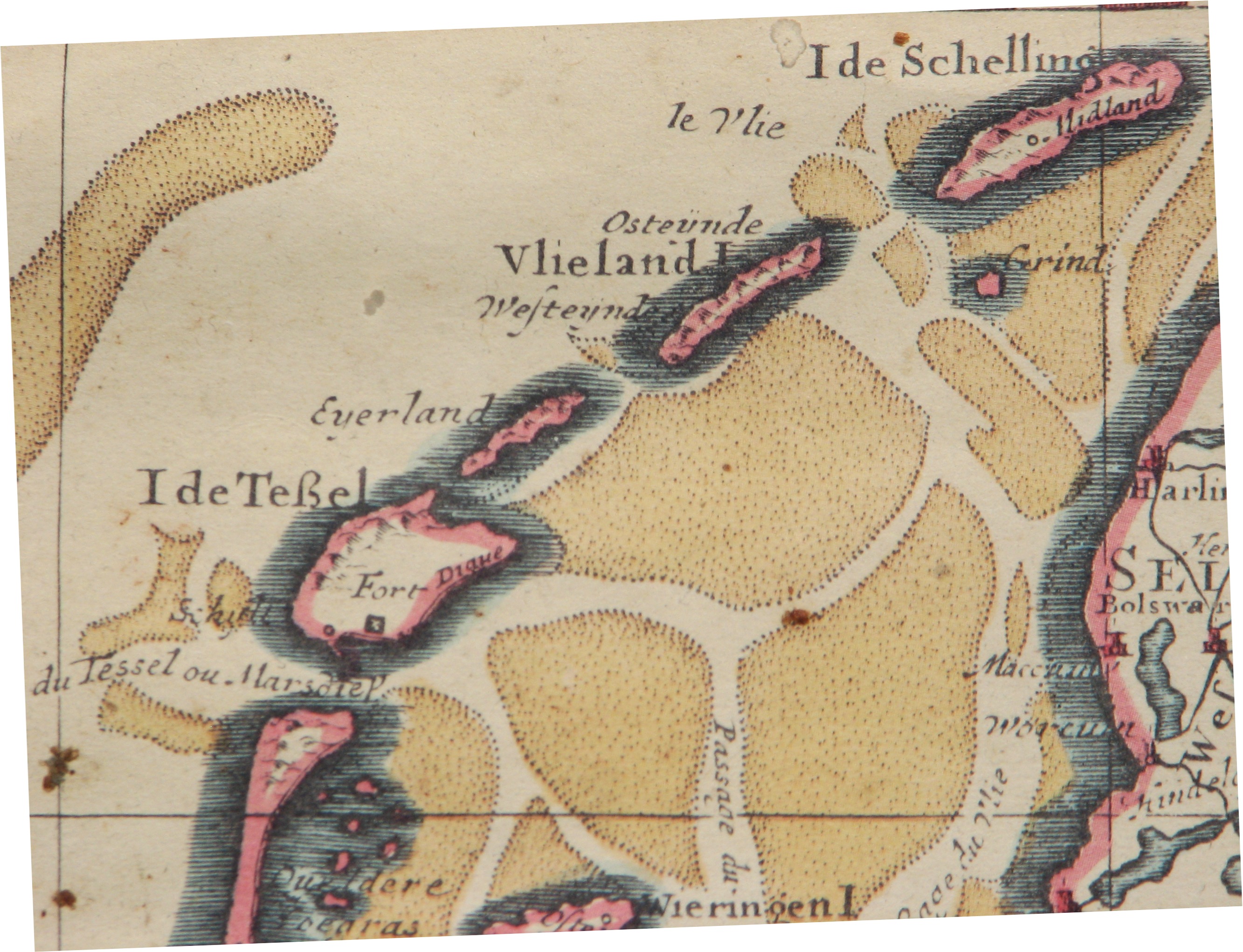
Eierland (here spelled "Eyerland") on a map originally published in 1702.

Eierland (Dutch pronunciation: [ˈɛiərlɑnt]) is a former island in the Netherlands. It is now the northern part of the island of Texel. The name means "egg land", named for the seagull eggs that were collected on the island and sent to Amsterdam.

The island of Eierland was a part of Vlieland until the 13th century, when it became a separate island. During the 16th century, a sand bank grew in the sea arm between Texel and Eierland, which eventually was submerged only at extremely high tide. In 1629 and 1630, a dam was built connecting the two islands, and Eierland ceased to exist as a separate island.

The shallow waters between the two islands were sold to a group of developers led by trader Nicolaas de Cock from Antwerp in 1835. Within twenty weeks, a dyke was built around this area, and a polder was created, the Eierlandse Polder. This meant a significant enlargement of the island of Texel.

The lighthouse of Texel, the Eierland Lighthouse, is located on the northern tip of the former island. This area was formerly known as het Engels Kerkhof, the English Cemetery. Many sailors from nearby shipwrecks were buried here.

The village of De Cocksdorp (named after Nicolaas de Cock) and the hamlets Midden-Eierland and Zuid-Eierland are located in the Eierlandse Polder.
