= Eierland Lighthouse =

Eierland Lighthouse Texel
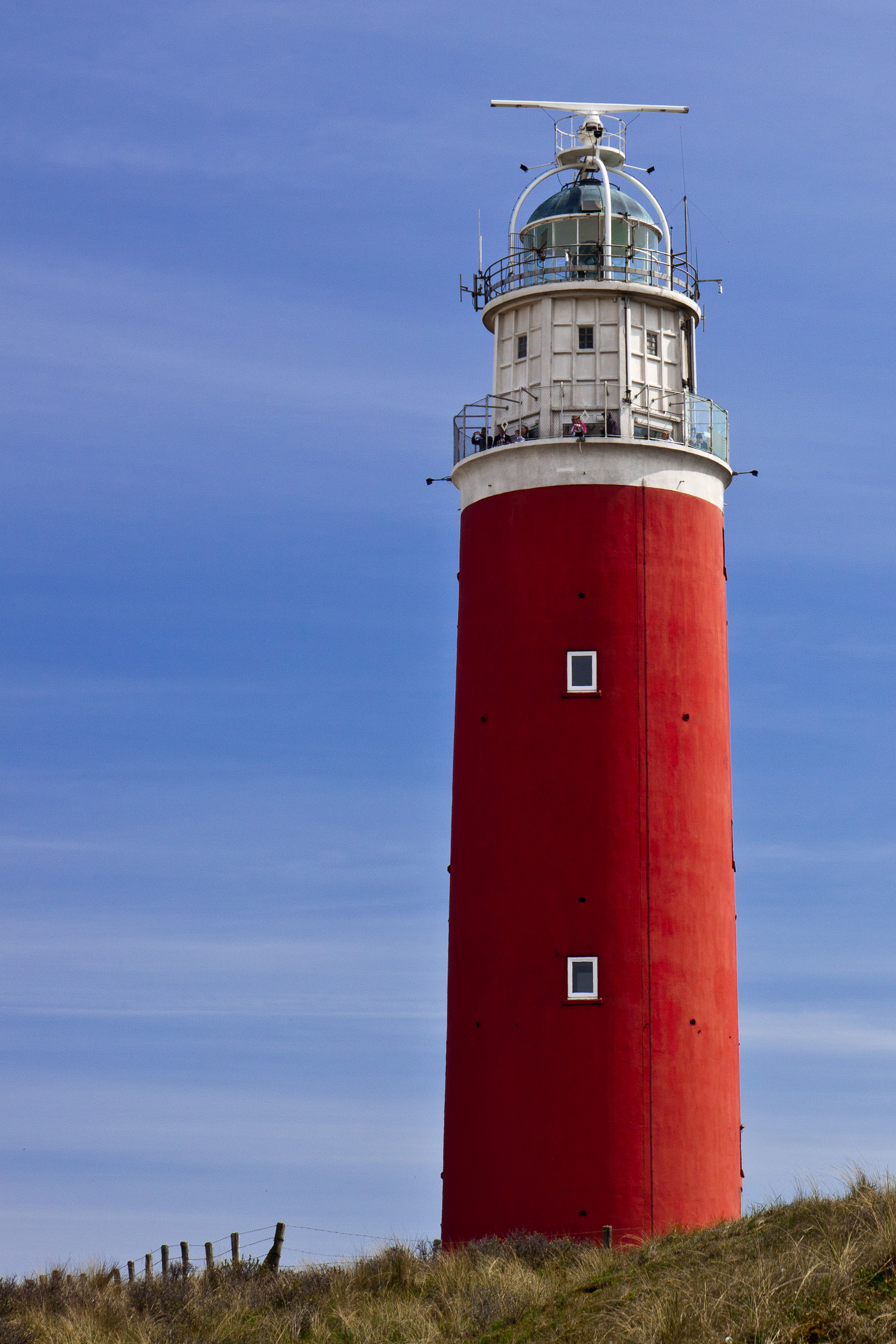
- Eierland Lighthouse
- Location: Eierland; Texel; Netherlands
- Coordinates: 53°10′55.7″N 4°51′18.9″E

Tower
- Constructed: 1864
- Construction: brick tower
- Height: 34.7 metres (114 ft)
- Shape: cylindrical tower with balcony and lantern
- Markings: red tower and white lantern
- Heritage: Rijksmonument

Light
- First lit: 1864
- Focal height: 53.2 metres (175 ft)
- Intensity: 2,850,000 cd
- Range: 29 nautical miles (54 km)
- Characteristic: FL(2) W 10s
- Netherlands no.: NL-2064

The Eierland Lighthouse is a lighthouse on the northernmost tip of the Dutch island of Texel. It is named for the former island Eierland.

== History ==
The lighthouse was designed by Quirinus Harder and construction began on 25 July 1863. The lighthouse was built on top of a 20-metre high sand dune, and was lit on 1 November 1864. At that time, the distance from the lighthouse to the sea was 3 kilometres.

Initially the lighthouse had a kerosene lamp. The current (electrical) lamp is a 2000 watt Philips fluorescent lamp, producing 2.85 million candela, and the light is focused with a number of Fresnel lenses. It has two automatically engaged spare lamps.

The lighthouse was originally red, but in the course of time that colour faded to pink. In 1977 the tower was covered with a red plastic coating. Since 1982 the lighthouse is a Rijksmonument.

During the Georgian Uprising of Texel of April 1945 the lighthouse suffered heavy damage. It was repaired by constructing a new wall around it and a new upper-level construction. In this process the lighthouse lost two of its original nine storeys.

During the 1990s the lighthouse, including the very top and the lamp, was open for visitors. Closed for a while, it was reopened in 2009 and is accessible up to the sixth floor.

== See also ==
- List of lighthouses in the Netherlands

== Gallery ==
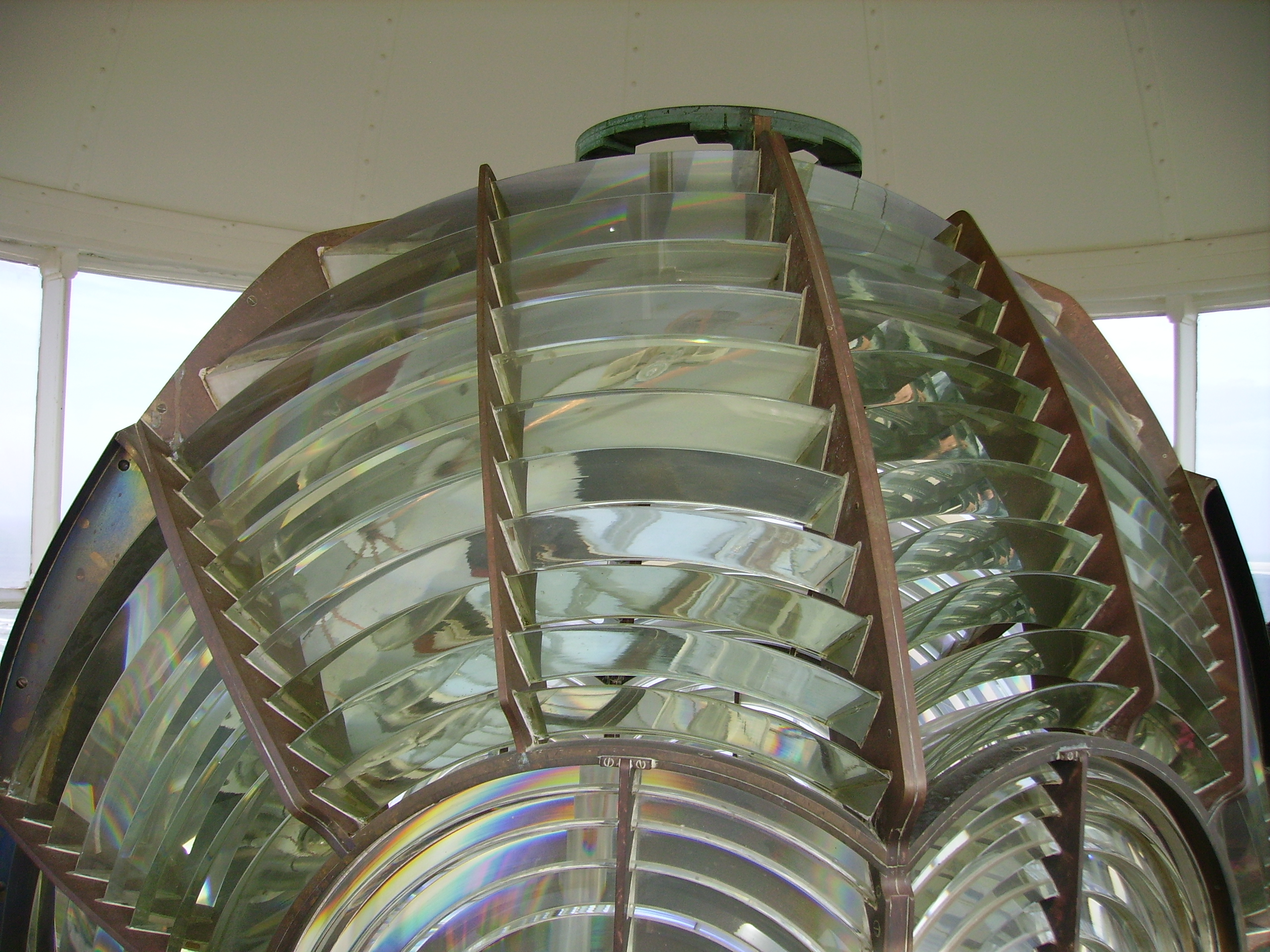
Lens

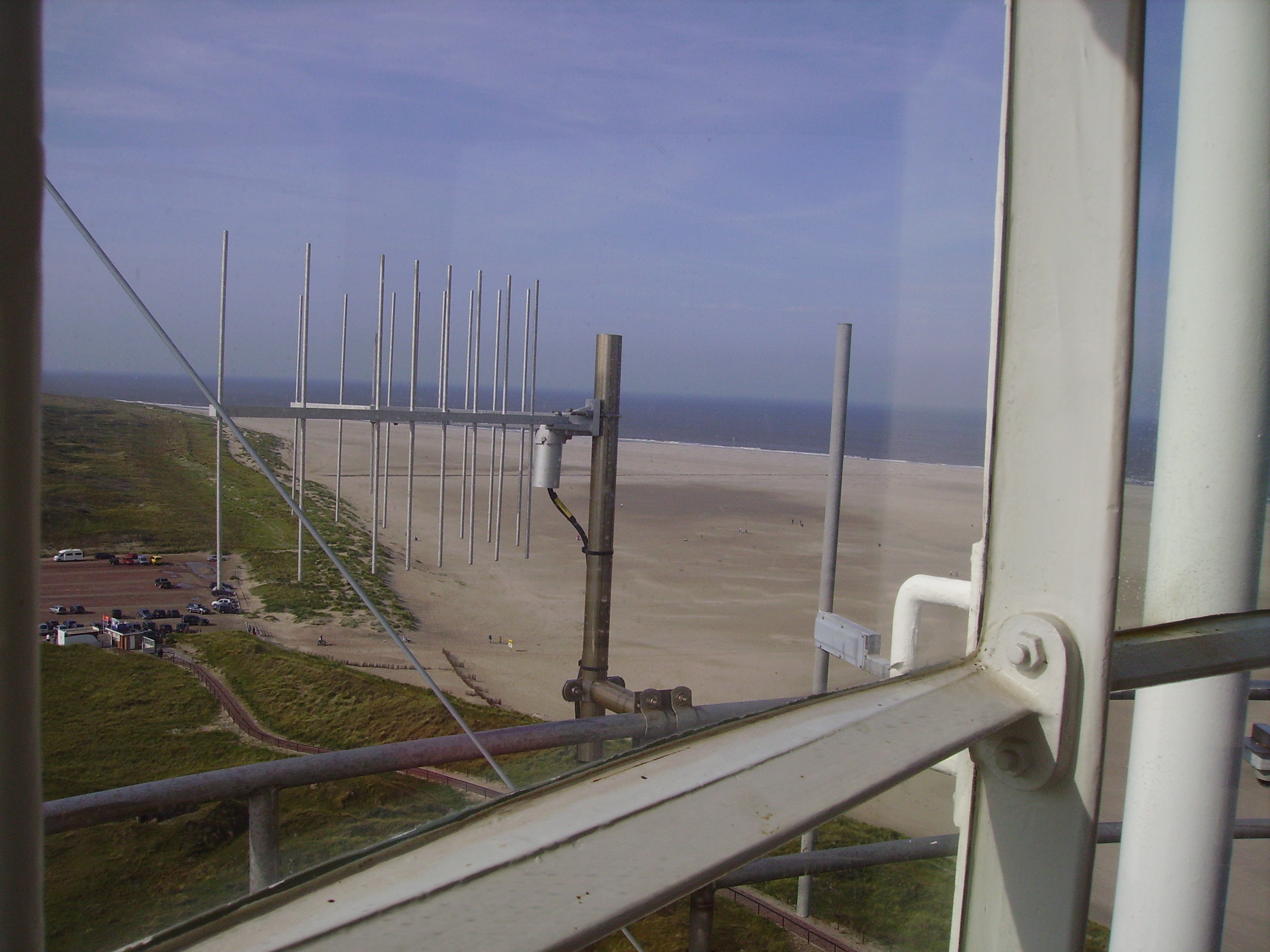
View to the west

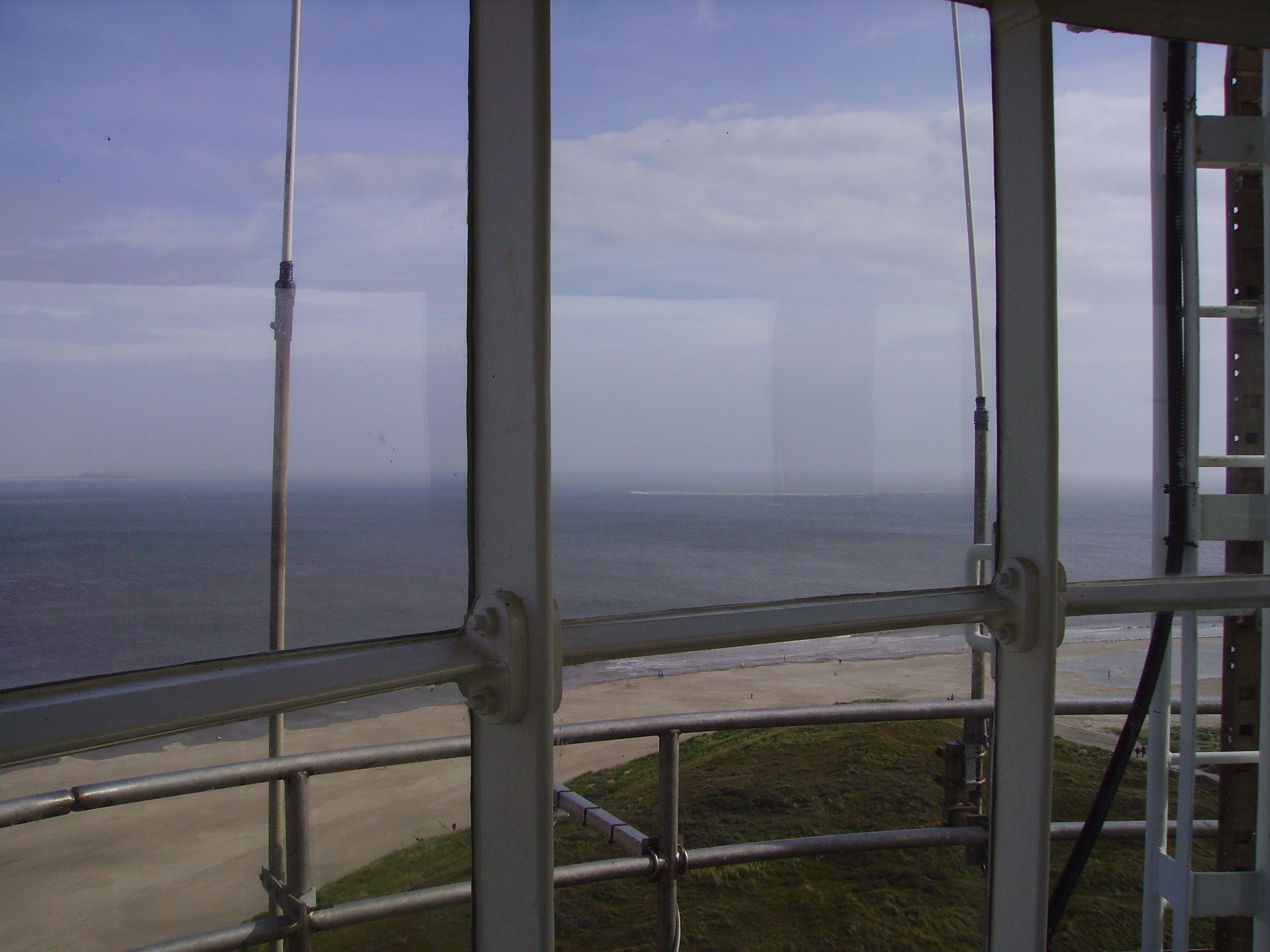
View to the east (Vlieland)
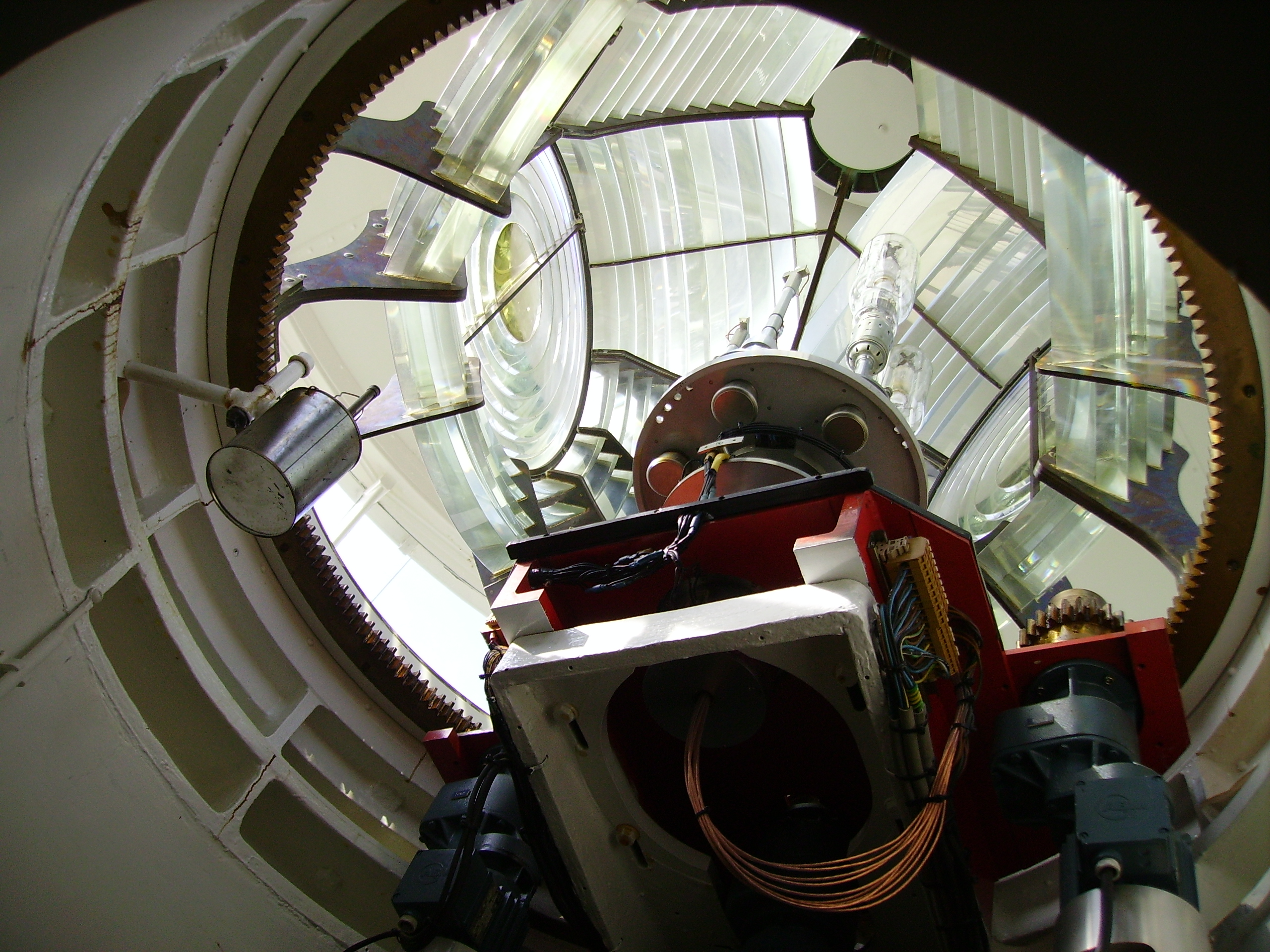
Lens and lamp from below

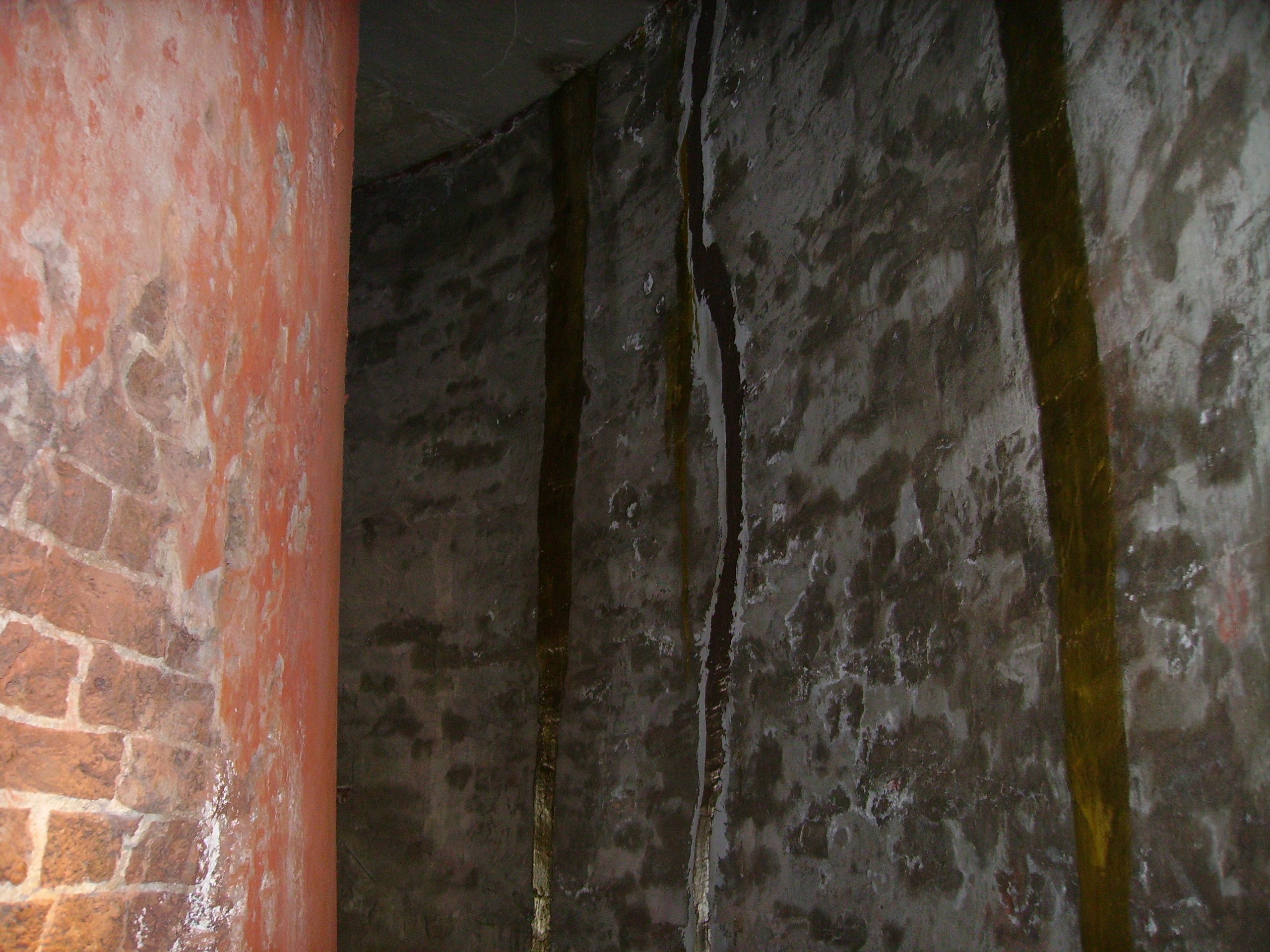
Space between the old lighthouse and the new enclosure
