= Nieuwe Sluis =

Lighthouse in Zeeland, Netherlands

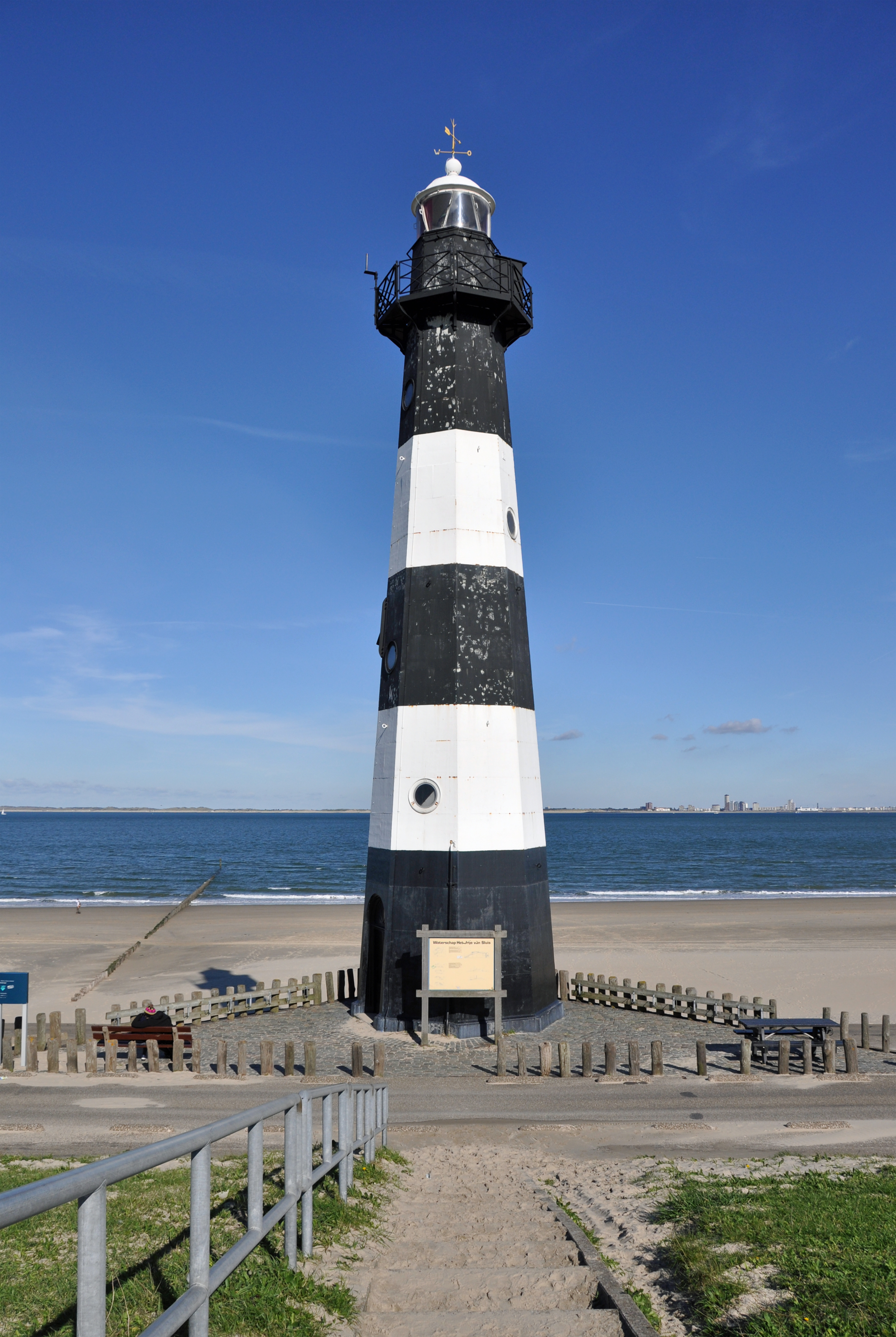
- Nieuwe Sluis
- Location: Breskens, Netherlands
- Coordinates: 51°24′25″N 3°31′17″E

Tower
- Constructed: 1867
- Construction: cast iron
- Height: 28.4 m
- Shape: octagon
- Heritage: Rijksmonument

Light
- First lit: 19 January 1868, 2016
- Deactivated: 2011
- Focal height: 28 m (92 ft)
- Intensity: 11,000 cd
- Range: 10 nautical miles (19 km)
- Characteristic: OC10 sec

Nieuwe Sluis is a Dutch lighthouse in the Nieuwesluis community, a few kilometres west of Breskens, Zeeland, and the southernmost in the country.

== History ==
Designed by Quirinus Harder, it was built between 1866 and 1867. The octagonal, black and white tower marks the entrance to the Westerschelde. The tower is 28.4 metres (93 ft) tall and consists of five stories. It is part of a series of lights marking the end of the Schelde river and guide traffic between the North Sea and the harbor of Antwerp.

Nieuwe Sluis is the oldest extant cast iron lighthouse in the Netherlands after the one in Renesse was demolished in 1915. Initially it was yellow, then it received red-white bands, before it was painted black and white. The lens assembly was made by the French company of Barbier, Bénard & Turenne, and includes a copper cupola. Initially it was the first in a series of leading lights. During World War II the lighthouse was deactivated and covered in camouflage paint; it was not reactivated until 1951.

Originally the lighthouse stood on top of the dike, but when that dike was raised as part of the Delta Works the lighthouse ended up on the seaside.

Since 2010 it no longer serves a nautical purpose and in October 2011 the light went out permanently. Alternative uses for the building were investigated. In 2012 ownership was transferred from the Belgian government to a foundation, and in 2014 that foundation was granted E20,000 by Dow Benelux for repairs and renovations.

== See also ==
- List of lighthouses in the Netherlands
