= Texel =

- Municipality and island
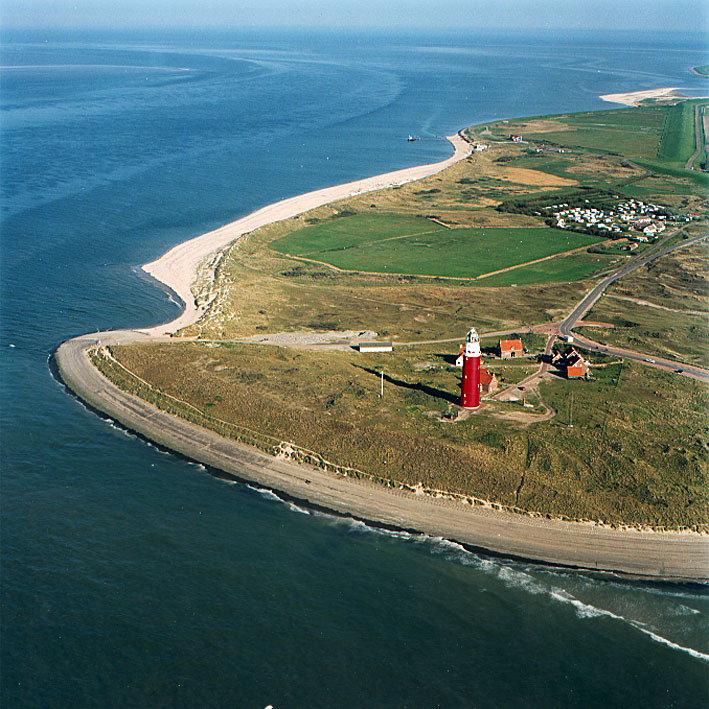
- North end of the island with the Eierland Lighthouse in 2015

- Flag Coat of arms

- Location in North Holland
- Coordinates: 53°3′N 4°48′E
- Country: Netherlands
- Province: North Holland

Government
  - Body: Municipal council
  - Mayor: Mark Pol (VVD)

Area
  - Total: 463.16 km^{2} (178.83 sq mi)
  - Land: 162.00 km^{2} (62.55 sq mi)
  - Water: 301.16 km^{2} (116.28 sq mi)
- Elevation: 2 m (6.6 ft)

Population (January 2021)
  - Total: 13,656
  - Density: 84/km^{2} (220/sq mi)
- Demonym(s): Tesselaar, Texelaar
- Time zone: UTC+1 (CET)
  - Summer (DST): UTC+2 (CEST)
- Postcode: 1790–1797
- Area code: 0222
- Website: www.texel.nl

Texel (Dutch pronunciation: [ˈtɛsəl]; Texels dialect: Tessel) is a municipality and an island with a population of 13,846 in North Holland, Netherlands. It is the largest and most populated island of the West Frisian Islands in the Wadden Sea. The island is situated north of Den Helder, northeast of Noorderhaaks, and southwest of Vlieland.

== Name ==
The name Texel is Frisian, but because of historical sound-changes in Dutch, where all -x- sounds have been replaced with -s- sounds (compare for instance English fox, Frisian fokse, German Fuchs with Dutch vos), the name is typically pronounced Tessel in Dutch.

== History ==
The All Saints' Flood of 1170 created the islands of Texel and Wieringen from North Holland. In the 13th century Ada, Countess of Holland was held prisoner on Texel by her uncle, William I, Count of Holland.

Texel received city rights in 1415.

The first Dutch expedition to the Northeast Passage departed from the island on 5 June 1594.

Texel was involved in the Battle of Scheveningen (1653) during the First Anglo-Dutch War and the Battle of Texel (1673) during the Third Anglo-Dutch War.

The shallow waters around Texel have been responsible for many shipwrecks, including in February 1643, the loss of a ship (the 'Palmwood Wreck') containing the household of Queen Henrietta Maria of France. Later wrecks included the British ship HMS Hero, sunk on the sands off Texel in 1811.

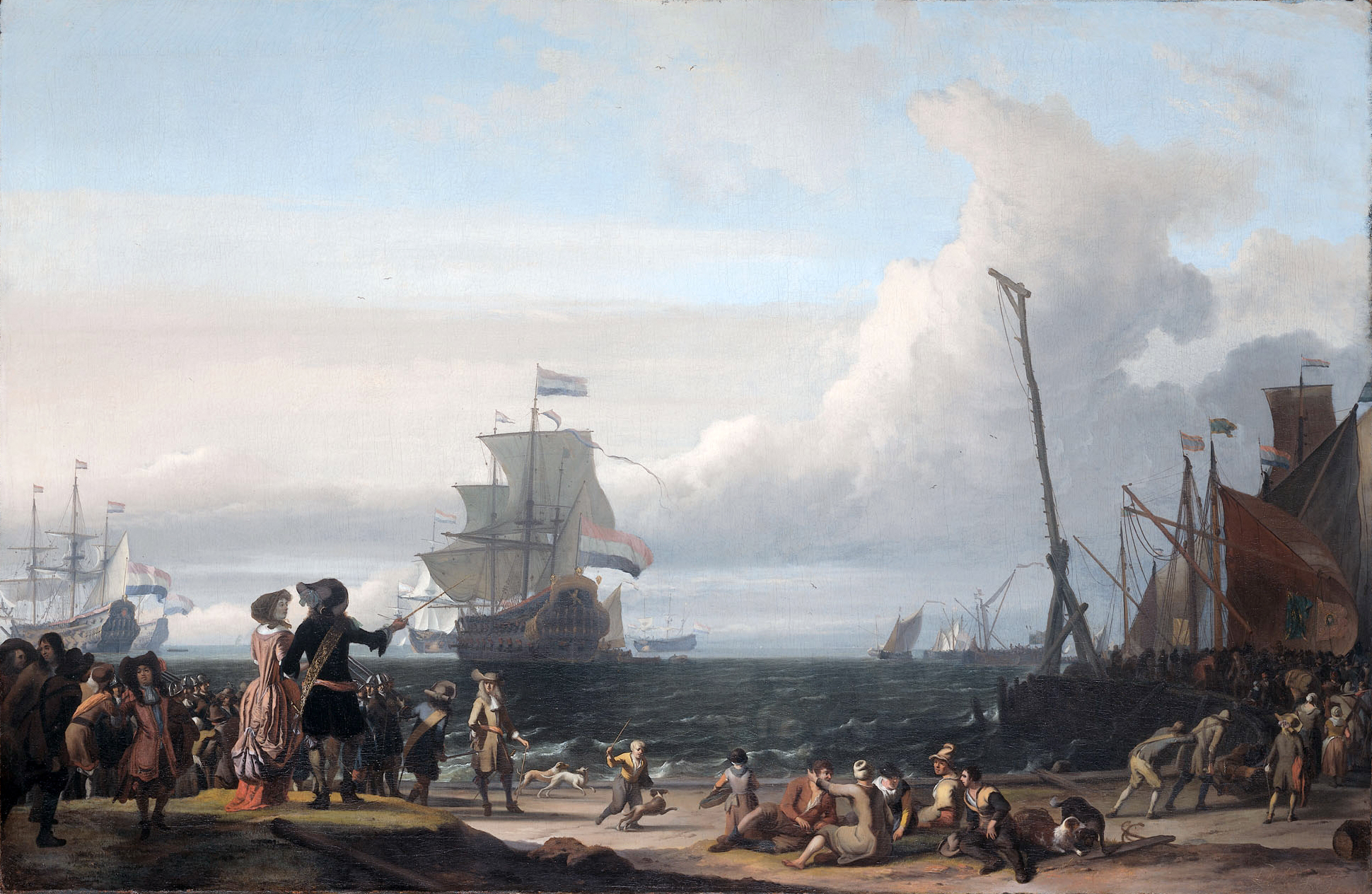
Dutch ships in the roadstead of Texel, 1671

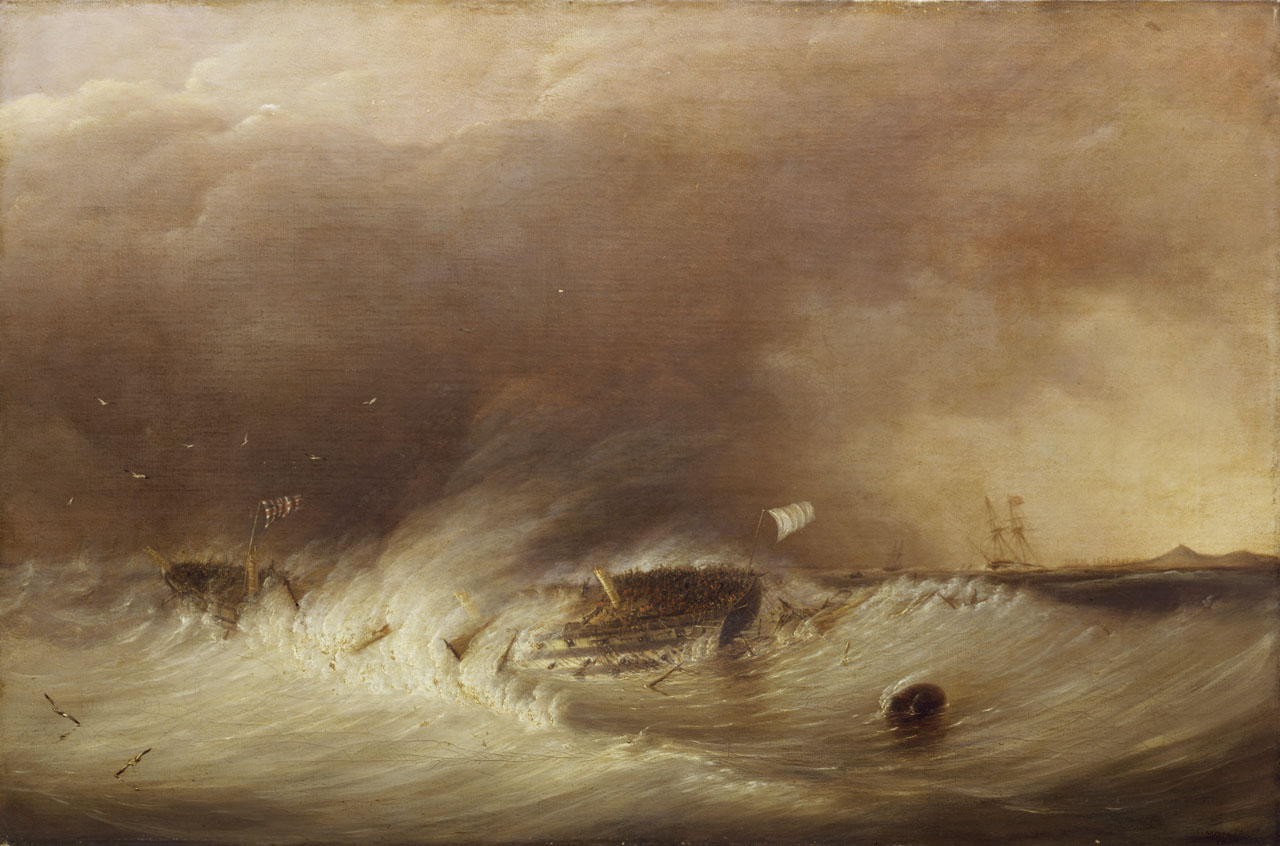
HMS Hero wrecked at Haak Sands near Texel 25 December 1811

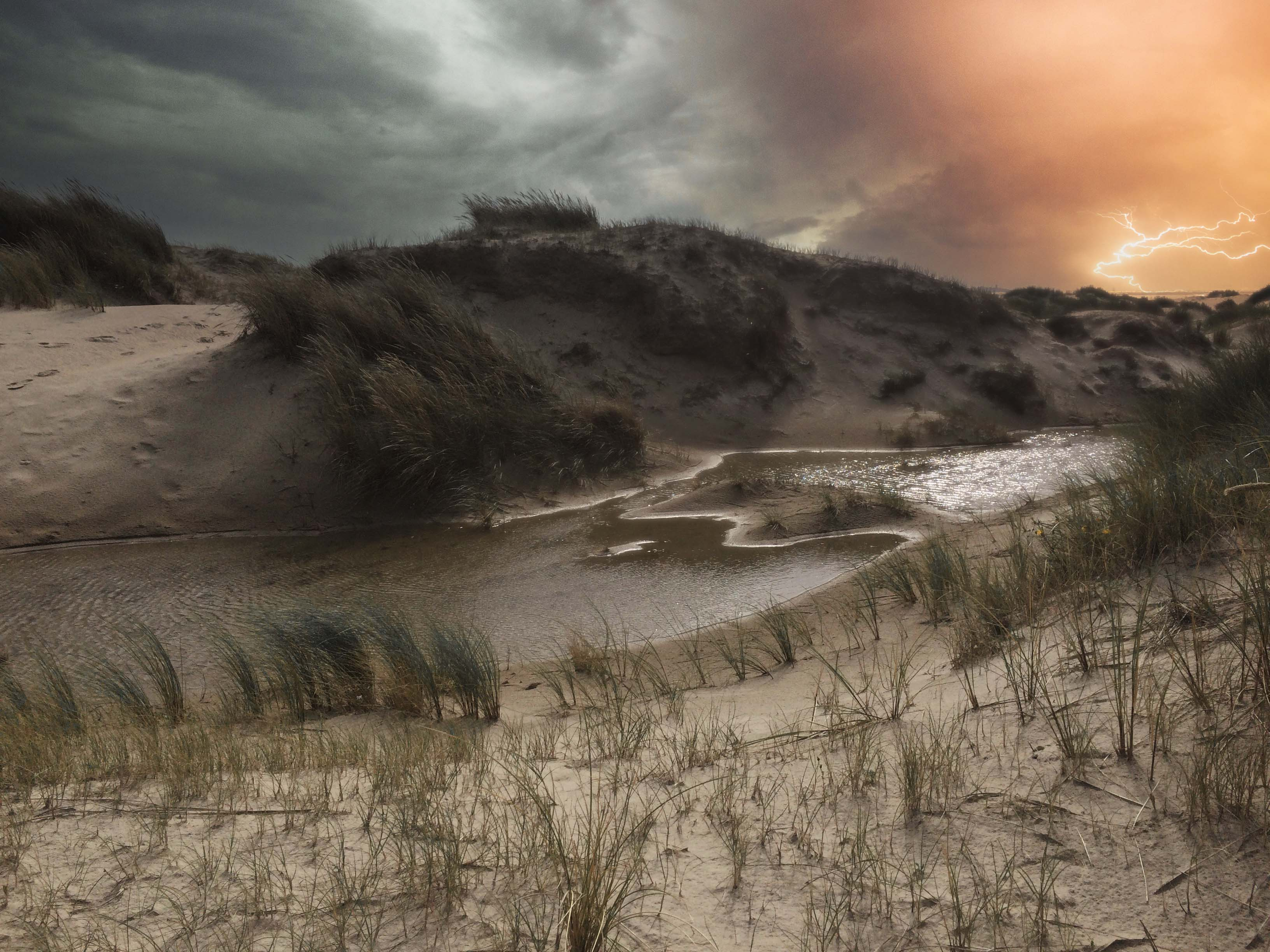
De Hors at Dunes of Texel National Park

During the American Revolutionary War, Texel was used as a port by Continental Navy officer John Paul Jones after the battle of Flamborough Head off the Yorkshire coast in September 1779. In the battle, Jones captured the Royal Navy frigate Serapis, which he sailed to Texel for desperately needed repairs. This event further complicated Anglo-Dutch relations.

In 1797, Texel was involved in the Battle of Camperdown during the French Revolutionary Wars.

During the First World War in 1914, the Battle off Texel took place off the coast of Texel.

On the night of 31 August 1940, the sea to the northwest of Texel was the scene of the sinking of two Royal Navy destroyers and the severe damage of a third by German mines in what is known as the Texel Disaster.

At the end of the Second World War in 1945, the Georgian uprising on Texel took place on the island. Following a German decision to redeploy Georgian soldiers to the mainland, they revolted and killed hundreds of their German comrades while they slept. The uprising lasted from 5 April 1945 until 20 May 1945, two weeks after V-E Day. At that point, Canadian troops arrived and arranged for the two sides to separately leave the island. For that reason, the uprising is often referred to as the final battle of the Second World War in Europe. Hundreds of Georgians who died fighting against the Germans are buried in a special cemetery on Texel commonly known as the "Russian cemetery".

== Geography ==
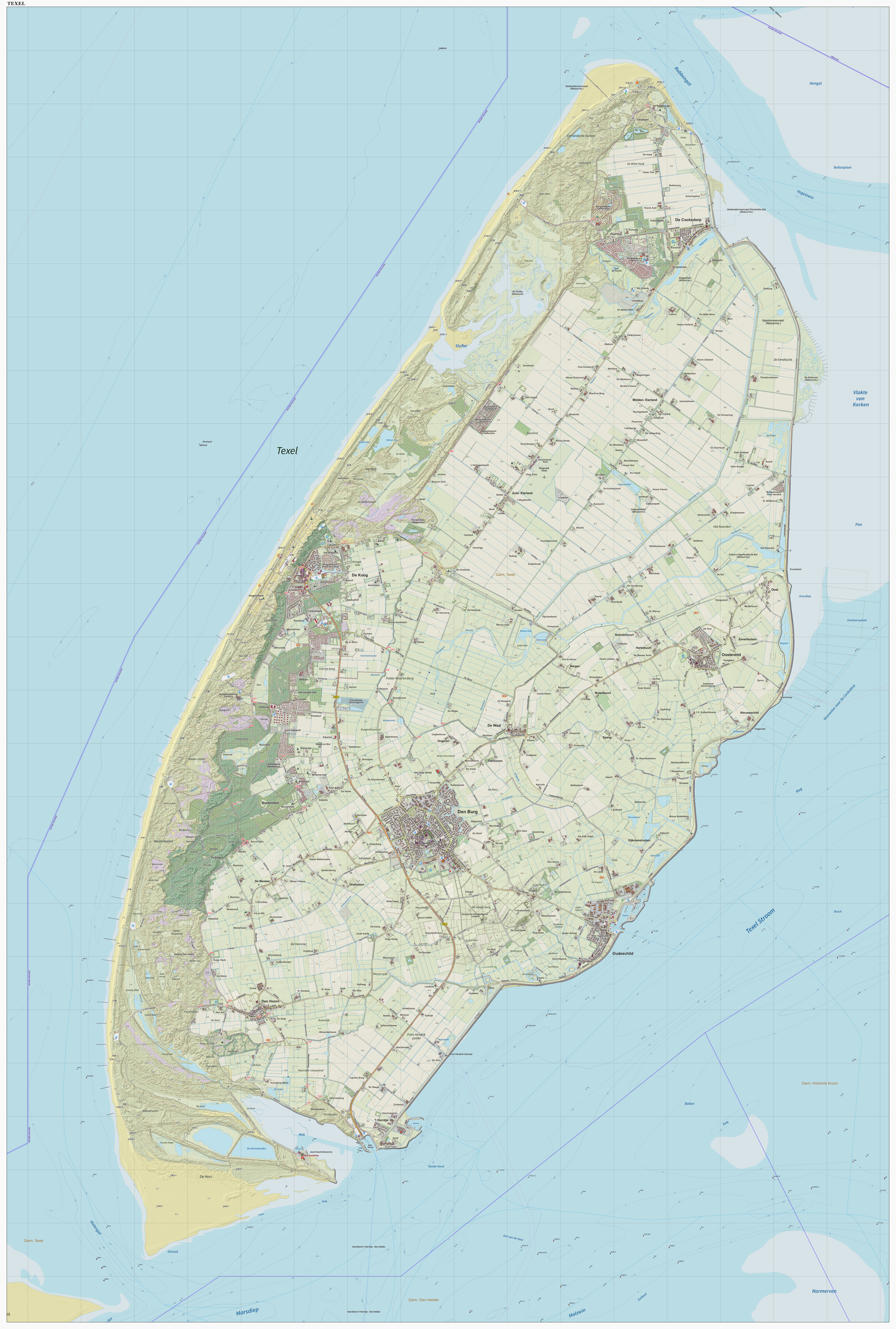
2014 map of Texel

Aerial view from the southwest

The municipality lies north of the mainland of the province of North Holland and west of the mainland of the province of Friesland. The island of Texel is situated north of the city of Den Helder, northeast of the uninhabited island of Noorderhaaks, which is part of the municipality, and southwest of the island of Vlieland.

The island of Texel was originally made up of two islands, Texel proper to the south and Eierland to the northeast, which were connected by shoals. In the early seventeenth century, the islands were connected by a dyke to keep the North Sea from ravaging the coastal areas of Texel proper. In the mid-nineteenth century a polder completed the northern half of the island. Today, Texel forms the largest natural barrier between the North Sea and the Wadden Sea.

The dune landscape along the western coast of the island is protected as Dunes of Texel National Park.

=== Landscape ===
The island is 23.7 km long and 9.6 km wide, its surface is 162.00 square kilometres. The highest point of the island is the dune "Bertusnol" (also "Nol van Bertus"), which is situated in the Dunes of Texel National Park, at 19.6 m.

The dune landscape on Texel is an important habitat for wildlife. Notable areas include De Slufter, where the tide comes in and meets the dunes, forming a marshy environment rich in both fauna and flora. In winter, birds of prey and geese take up residence. About a third of Texel is a protected nature reserve. A wetland called Utopia has been designed for birds to nest in.

=== Climate ===
Texel has an oceanic climate (Köppen Cfb) that is heavily influenced by its offshore position. The annual average high oscillation is between 5 °C (41 °F) and 21 °C (70 °F). While winters are similar to mainland areas, summers remain cooler. The relative proximity to the mainland still renders heat bursts to reach Texel with five months having recorded temperatures above 30 °C (86 °F). While the island is relatively rainy, the precipitation is generally quite even and moderate throughout most of the year although there is a dry peak in late spring and a rain peak in autumn.

Climate data for Texel
Month	Jan	Feb	Mar	Apr	May	Jun	Jul	Aug	Sep	Oct	Nov	Dec	Year
Record high °C (°F)	13.7 (56.7)	14.9 (58.8)	20.5 (68.9)	27.9 (82.2)	31.0 (87.8)	36.2 (97.2)	34.6 (94.3)	33.8 (92.8)	32.6 (90.7)	24.8 (76.6)	17.7 (63.9)	15.3 (59.5)	36.2 (97.2)
Mean daily maximum °C (°F)	5.5 (41.9)	5.5 (41.9)	8.3 (46.9)	11.7 (53.1)	15.4 (59.7)	18 (64)	20.3 (68.5)	20.6 (69.1)	17.9 (64.2)	14 (57)	9.7 (49.5)	6.4 (43.5)	12.8 (54.9)
Mean daily minimum °C (°F)	1.2 (34.2)	0.8 (33.4)	2.8 (37.0)	5 (41)	8.6 (47.5)	11.3 (52.3)	13.8 (56.8)	14 (57)	11.7 (53.1)	8.5 (47.3)	4.9 (40.8)	2 (36)	7.1 (44.7)
Record low °C (°F)	−18.8 (−1.8)	−18.5 (−1.3)	−14.5 (5.9)	−4.8 (23.4)	−2.1 (28.2)	1.5 (34.7)	5.2 (41.4)	5.6 (42.1)	3.0 (37.4)	−4.6 (23.7)	−10.8 (12.6)	−12.3 (9.9)	−18.8 (−1.8)
Average precipitation mm (inches)	66.2 (2.61)	44.4 (1.75)	52.4 (2.06)	33.7 (1.33)	45 (1.8)	54.1 (2.13)	59.8 (2.35)	76.8 (3.02)	83.7 (3.30)	95.9 (3.78)	83.5 (3.29)	69.8 (2.75)	765.3 (30.17)
Mean monthly sunshine hours	64.1	91.1	134.8	194.2	235.2	219	228.2	208.2	148	114.2	63.1	51	1,751.1
Source 1:
Source 2:

== Notable people ==
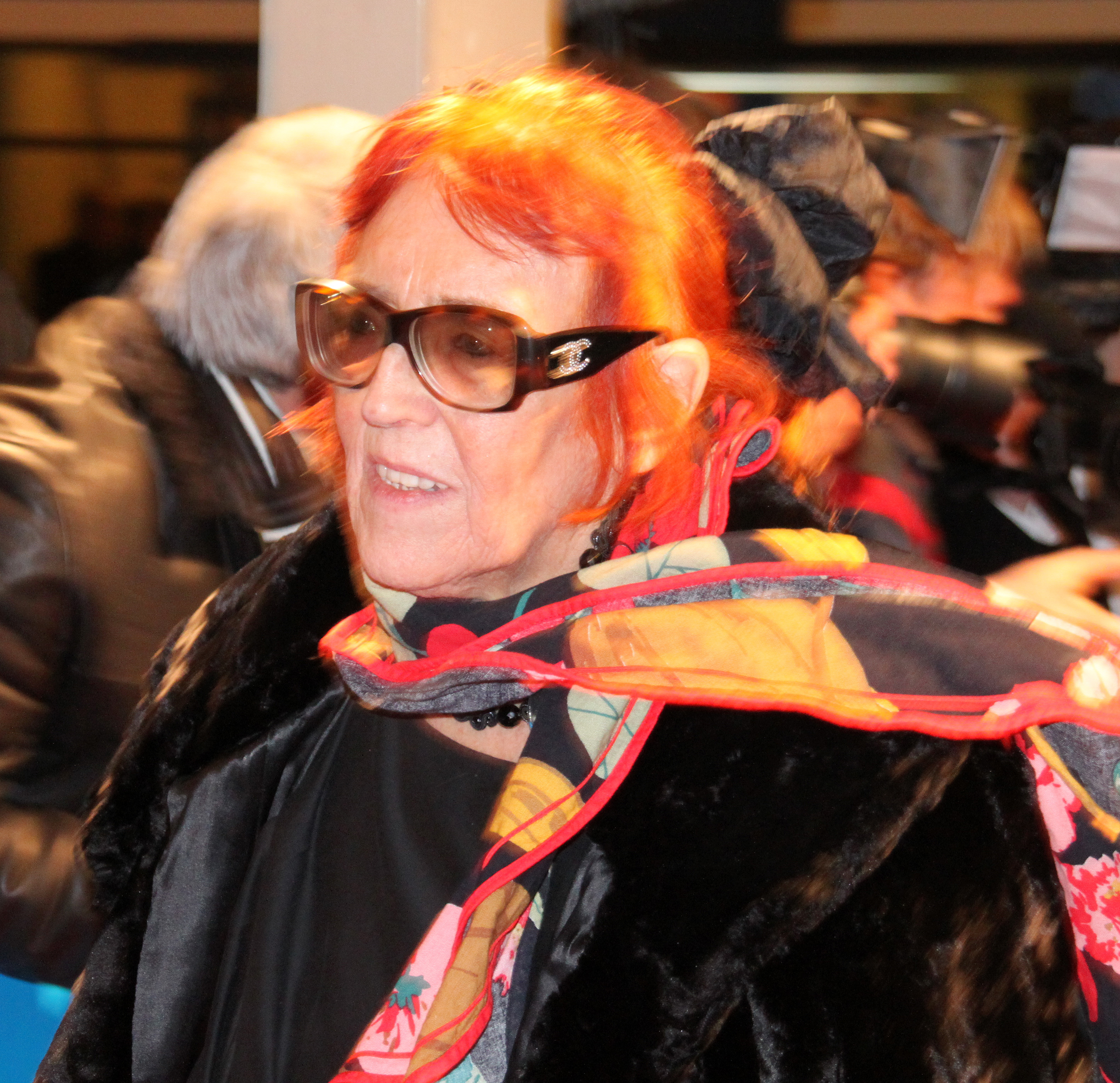
Imme Dros, 2010

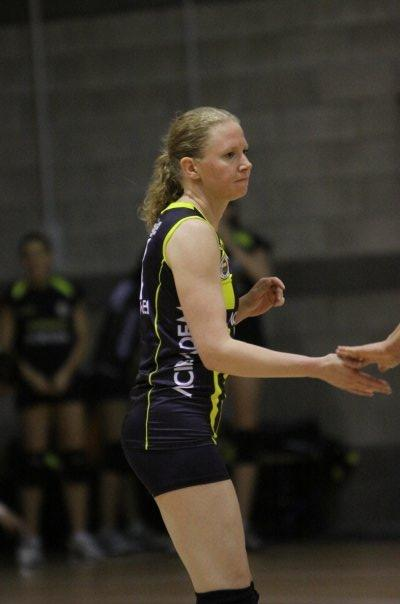
Alice Blom, 2010

- Willem Eduard Bok (1846 in Den Burg – 1904), a Dutch-born South African Boer politician, civil servant and statesman
- Rene Daalder (1944–2019), a writer and director
- Cornelis de Jager (1921 in Den Burg – 2021), an astronomer who predicted solar variation
- Imme Dros (born 1936 in Oudeschild), a writer of children's literature
- Hans Kamp (born 1940 in Den Burg), a philosopher and linguist, introduced Discourse Representation Theory
- Willem Hendrik Keesom (1876 on Texel – 1956), a physicist who first froze liquid helium
- Sim Visser (1908 in Eierland – 1983), a politician
- Henk Zijm (born 1952 in Driehuizen), a mathematician from the University of Twente

=== Sport ===
- Denise Betsema (born 1993 in Oudeschild), a cyclo-cross cyclist
- Alice Blom (born 1980 in Oudeschild), a volleyball player
- Dorian van Rijsselberghe (born 1988 in Den Burg), a sailor, gold medallist at the 2012 and 2016 Summer Olympics

== Economy ==
The tourism industry forms a substantial part of the economy on Texel. Approximately 70% of activities are in some way related to tourism. Popular forms of tourism on Texel include cycling, walking, swimming and horse riding. Farming (sheep, potatoes, dairy, tulips, and grain) and fishing (primarily from Oudeschild) are traditional.

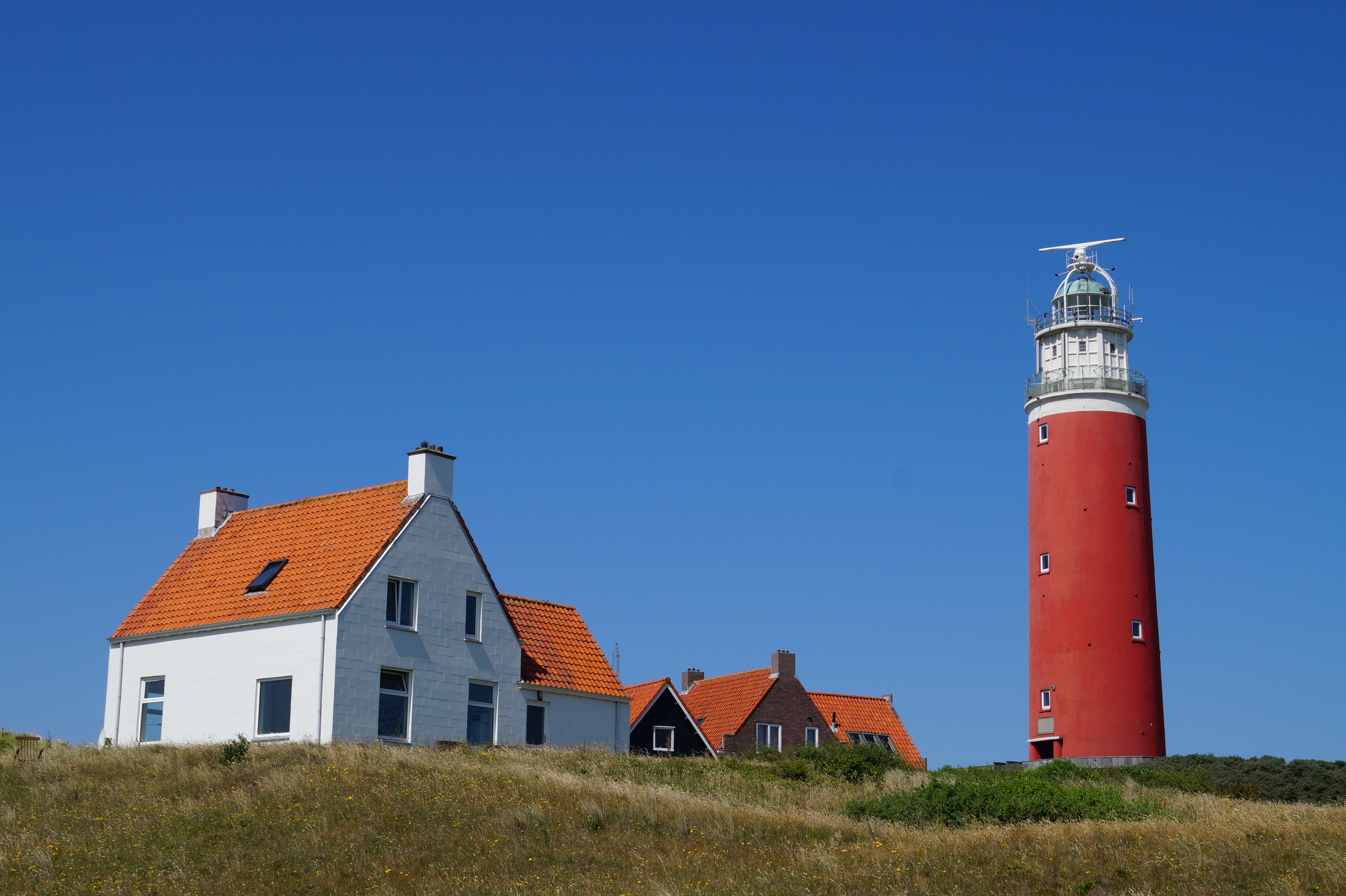
Eierland Lighthouse in 2013

== Local government ==
The municipal council of Texel consists of 15 seats, which are divided as follows (from the most recent election results in 2026:

- Hart voor Texel – 4 seats
- VVD – 3 seats
- Texels Belang – 2 seats
- PvdA – 2 seats
- GroenLinks– 2 seats
- D66 – 1 seat
- CDA – 1 seat

== Transport ==
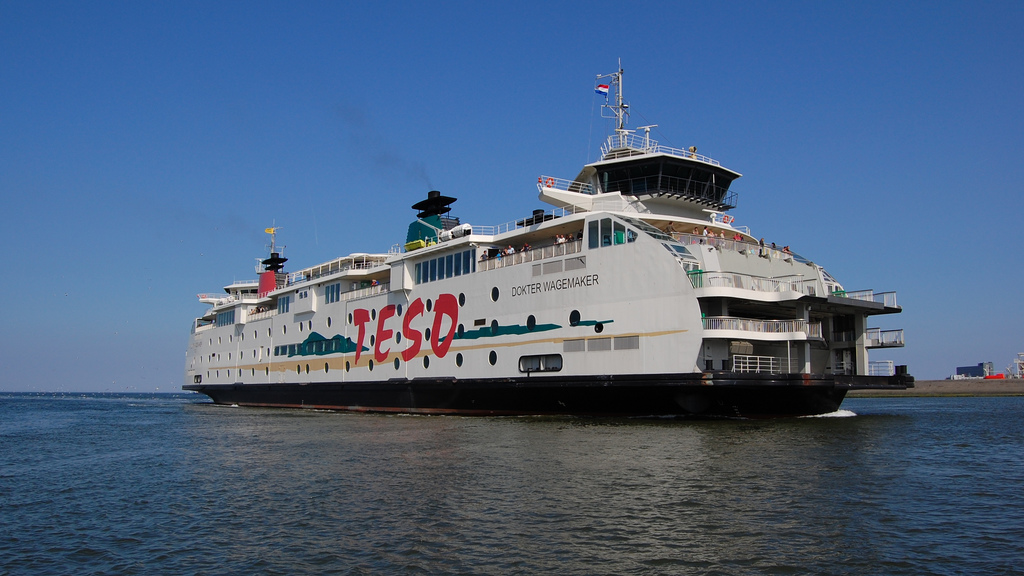
Ferry MS Dokter Wagemaker (2) from Den Helder to Texel in 2005

Transport around the island is typically by bicycle, bus (Texelhopper) or car. The island has an extensive cycle path network. It is connected to the mainland via a ferry operated by Royal TESO from Den Helder, and by air via Texel International Airport. The ferry Texelstroom uses 80% compressed natural gas.

== See also ==
- Texel sheep
