= List of lighthouses in the Netherlands =

A list of lighthouses in the Netherlands.

== Active lighthouses ==
Name	Image	Location	Province	Tower height	Light characteristic	Year built	Architect
Urk Lighthouse	Vuurtoren Urk	Urk	Flevoland	18,5 m (27 m above NAP)	Fl W 5s (18 nautical miles (33 km))	1844–1845	Valk, J.
Bornrif	Bornrif	Ameland	Friesland	55,3 m (58 m above NAP)	Fl(3) W 15s (30 nautical miles (56 km))	1880–1881	Harder, Quirinus
North Tower	Noordertoren	Schiermonnikoog	Friesland	37 m (44 m above NAP)	Fl(4) W 20s (28 nautical miles (52 km))	1853–1854	Jansen, H.G.
Stavoren Lighthouse	Vuurtoren van Stavoren	Stavoren	Friesland	15,7 m (15 m above NAP)	Iso W 4s (12 nautical miles (22 km))	1884	Harder, Quirinus
Brandaris	Brandaris	Terschelling	Friesland	52,5 m (55 m above NAP)	Fl W 5s (29 nautical miles (54 km))	1593–1594	
Vuurduin	Vuurduin	Vlieland	Friesland	16,8 m (54 m above NAP)	Iso W 4s (20 nautical miles (37 km))	1909	Harder, Quirinus
Lange Jaap	Lange Jaap	Den Helder	North Holland	55,5 m (57 m above NAP)	Fl(4) W 20s (30 nautical miles (56 km))	1877–1878	Harder, Quirinus
Den Oever Lighthouse	Vuurtoren van Den Oever	Den Oever	North Holland	15 m above NAP	Iso WRG 5s (10 nautical miles (19 km))	1884	Harder, Quirinus
J.C.J. van Speijk Lighthouse	Vuurtoren J.C.J. van Speijk	Egmond aan Zee	North Holland	28 m (37 m above NAP)	Iso WR 10s (18 nautical miles (33 km))	1833–1834	Valk, J.
Hoge vuurtoren van IJmuiden	Hoge vuurtoren van IJmuiden	IJmuiden	North Holland	41,8 m (53 m above NAP)	Fl W 5s (29 nautical miles (54 km))	1878	Harder, Quirinus
Lage vuurtoren van IJmuiden	Lage vuurtoren van IJmuiden	IJmuiden	North Holland	24 m (31 m above NAP)	F WR (16 nautical miles (30 km))	1878	Harder, Quirinus
Groote Kaap	vuurtoren in Julianadorp	Julianadorp	North Holland	16,8 m (31 m above NAP)	Oc WRG 10s (11 nautical miles (20 km))	1966	
Paard van Marken	Paard van Marken	Marken	North Holland	15,5 m (16 m above NAP)	Oc W 8s (9 nautical miles (17 km))	1839	Valk, J.
De Ven	De Ven	Oosterdijk	North Holland	15 m (17 m above NAP)	LFlW10s (11 nautical miles (20 km))	1700	
Eierland Lighthouse	Vuurtoren Eierland	Texel	North Holland	34,7 m (53 m above NAP)	Fl(2) W 10s (29 nautical miles (54 km))	1863–1864	Harder, Quirinus
Nieuwe Sluis	Vuurtoren van Breskens	Breskens	Zeeland	22,4 m (28 m above NAP)	Oc WRG 10s (14 nautical miles (26 km))	1867	Harder, Quirinus
Westerlichttoren (Westenschouwen)	Westerlichttoren	Haamstede	Zeeland	50 m (58 m above NAP)	Fl(2+1) W 15s (30 nautical miles (56 km))	1837–1840	Valk, L.
Tall lighthouse of Westkapelle	Hoge vuurtoren van Westkapelle	Westkapelle	Zeeland	52,3 m (49 m above NAP)	Fl W 3s (28 nautical miles (52 km))	1818; 1458–1470	
Short lighthouse of Westkapelle (Noorderhoofd)	Lage vuurtoren van Westkapelle	Westkapelle	Zeeland	16,1 m (20 m above NAP)	Oc WRG 10s (13 nautical miles (24 km))	1875	Harder, Quirinus
Hellevoetsluis Lighthouse	Vuurtoren van Hellevoetsluis	Hellevoetsluis	South Holland	18,1 m (17 m above NAP)	Iso WRG 10s (11 nautical miles (20 km))	1822	Valk, J.
Westhoofd Lighthouse	Vuurtoren Westhoofd	Ouddorp	South Holland	52 m (56 m above NAP)	Fl(3) W 15s (30 nautical miles (56 km))	1947–1948	Friedhoff, G.
Noordwijk Lighthouse	Vuurtoren van Noordwijk	Noordwijk	South Holland	25,5 m (33 m above NAP)	Oc(3) W 20s (18 nautical miles (33 km))	1921–1922	Jelsma, C.
Hoge vuurtoren Europoort	Hoge vuurtoren Nieuwe Waterweg	Rotterdam	South Holland	44 m above NAP	Oc G 6s (16 nautical miles (30 km))	1970–1971	Bouwdienst Rijkswaterstaat
Lage vuurtoren Europoort	Vuurtoren Europoort Laag	Rotterdam	South Holland	30 m above NAP	Oc G 6s (16 nautical miles (30 km))	1970	
Hoge vuurtoren Maasmond	Maasmond Hoge Vuurtoren	Rotterdam	South Holland	47 m above NAP	Iso W 4s (21 nautical miles (39 km))	1971	
Lage vuurtoren Maasmond	Maasmond Lage Vuurtoren	Rotterdam	South Holland	30 m above NAP	Iso W 4s (21 nautical miles (39 km))	1971	
Lighthouse at the Maasvlakte	Vuurtoren Maasvlakte	Rotterdam	South Holland	62 m (67 m above NAP)	Fl(5) W 20s (28 nautical miles (52 km))	1974	Colenbrander, W.
Hoge vuurtoren Nieuwe Waterweg	Nieuwe Waterweg Hoge Vuurtoren	Rotterdam	South Holland	44 m above NAP	Iso R 6s (18 nautical miles (33 km))	1970	
Lage vuurtoren Nieuwe Waterweg	Nieuwe Waterweg Lage Vuurtoren	Rotterdam	South Holland	30 m above NAP	Iso R 6s (18 nautical miles (33 km))	1970	
Scheveningen Lighthouse	Vuurtoren van Scheveningen	Scheveningen	South Holland	30 m (49 m above NAP)	Fl(2) W 10s (29 nautical miles (54 km))	1875	Harder, Quirinus
Vuurtoreneiland	Vuurtoreneiland	Durgerdam	North Holland	19,5 m (18 m above NAP)	Oc WR 5s (14 nautical miles (26 km))	1893–2003, 2005-	Loo, A.C. van

== Deactivated lighthouses ==
Name	Image	Location	Province	Year deactivated	Tower height	Light characteristic	Year built	Architect
Harlingen Lighthouse	Vuurtoren van Harlingen	Harlingen	Friesland	1998	21 m above NAP	F WR	1921	Jelsma, C.
Lemmer Lighthouse	Vuurtoren van Lemmer	Lemmer	Friesland	1993	19,2 m		1993	
Zuidertoren	Zuidertoren	Schiermonnikoog	Friesland	1909			1853–1854	Jansen, H.G.
Workum Lighthouse	Vuurtoren van Workum	Workum	Friesland	1932	9 m		1778	
Stenen Baak		Brielle	South Holland	1850	15 m		1630	Paeyse, M. Czn
Goedereede Lighthouse	Toren van Goedereede (2007)	Goedereede	South Holland	1991	19,5 m		1467–1512, lighthouse since 1834	
Hoge vuurtoren van Hoek van Holland	Hoge vuurtoren van Hoek van Holland	Hook of Holland	South Holland	1974			1893	Loo, A.C. van
Low Light of the Hook of Holland	Lage vuurtoren van Hoek van Holland	Hook of Holland	South Holland	1967	13,5 m		1899	Loo, A.C. van
Katwijk Lighthouse	Vuurtoren van Katwijk	Katwijk	South Holland	1913			1605	

== Demolished ==
Name	Town	Province	Year of demolition	Height	Light	Year	Architect	Photo
Harlingen Lighthouse	Harlingen	Friesland	1921			1904		
Lemmer Lighthouse	Lemmer	Friesland	1968			1910		
Terschelling Lighthouse	Terschelling	Friesland	1593			1323		
Vlieland Lighthouse	Vlieland	Friesland	1909	11,6 m		1836		
Delfzijl Lighthouse	Delfzijl	Groningen	1940	10,5 m		1888		
Tweede vuurtoren van Delfzijl	Delfzijl	Groningen	1981	14,4 m (17 m above NAP)	F WRG (12 nautical miles (22 km))	1949		
Watum Lighthouse	Delfzijl	Groningen	1945	10,5 m		1888		
Fort Kijkduin	Den Helder	North Holland	1877	22,0 m		1822		
Zuidertoren	Egmond aan Zee	North Holland	1915	18,2 m (38 m above NAP)	F R	1833–1834		
Hoek van 't IJ	Durgerdam	North Holland	1893	19 m		1700		
Marken Lighthouse	Marken	North Holland				1700		
Zandvoort Lighthouse	Zandvoort	North Holland	1907					
Hoge vuurtoren van Renesse	Renesse	Zeeland	1916	45 m above NAP		1848		
Lage vuurtoren van Renesse	Renesse	Zeeland	1915	35 m above NAP		1856		
Oostvoorne Lighthouse	Oostvoorne	South Holland	1552			1360–1390		
Vuurtoren Westhoofd (1911)	Ouddorp	South Holland	1945	33,0 m	Fl(3) W 15s	1911–1912		
Vuurtoren Flaauwe Werk	Ouddorp	South Holland	1911	24 m (28 m above NAP)		1862		
Vuurtoren van Noordwijk	Noordwijk	South Holland	Extinguished 1913			1854		
Vuurtoren van Scheveningen (16e eeuw)	Scheveningen	South Holland		29 m		16th century		

== See also ==
- Lists of lighthouses and lightvessels
- List of lighthouses in Friesland
