= North Tower =

North Tower may refer to:

- North Tower (lighthouse), a lighthouse in Schiermonnikoog, Netherlands
- North Tower (Salford), a building in Salford, England
- 1 World Trade Center (1971–2001), known as the North Tower of the World Trade Center
- North Tower, 30 Hudson Yards, a skyscraper in New York City

== See also ==
- South Tower (disambiguation)
