= Oosterdijk =

Oosterdijk may refer to:

- The Holland America Line freighter Oosterdijk, later USS Oosterdijk (ID-2586)
- Oosterdijk, Netherlands, a hamlet in North Holland
