= Groote Kaap =

Groote Kaap Lighthouse Julianadorp
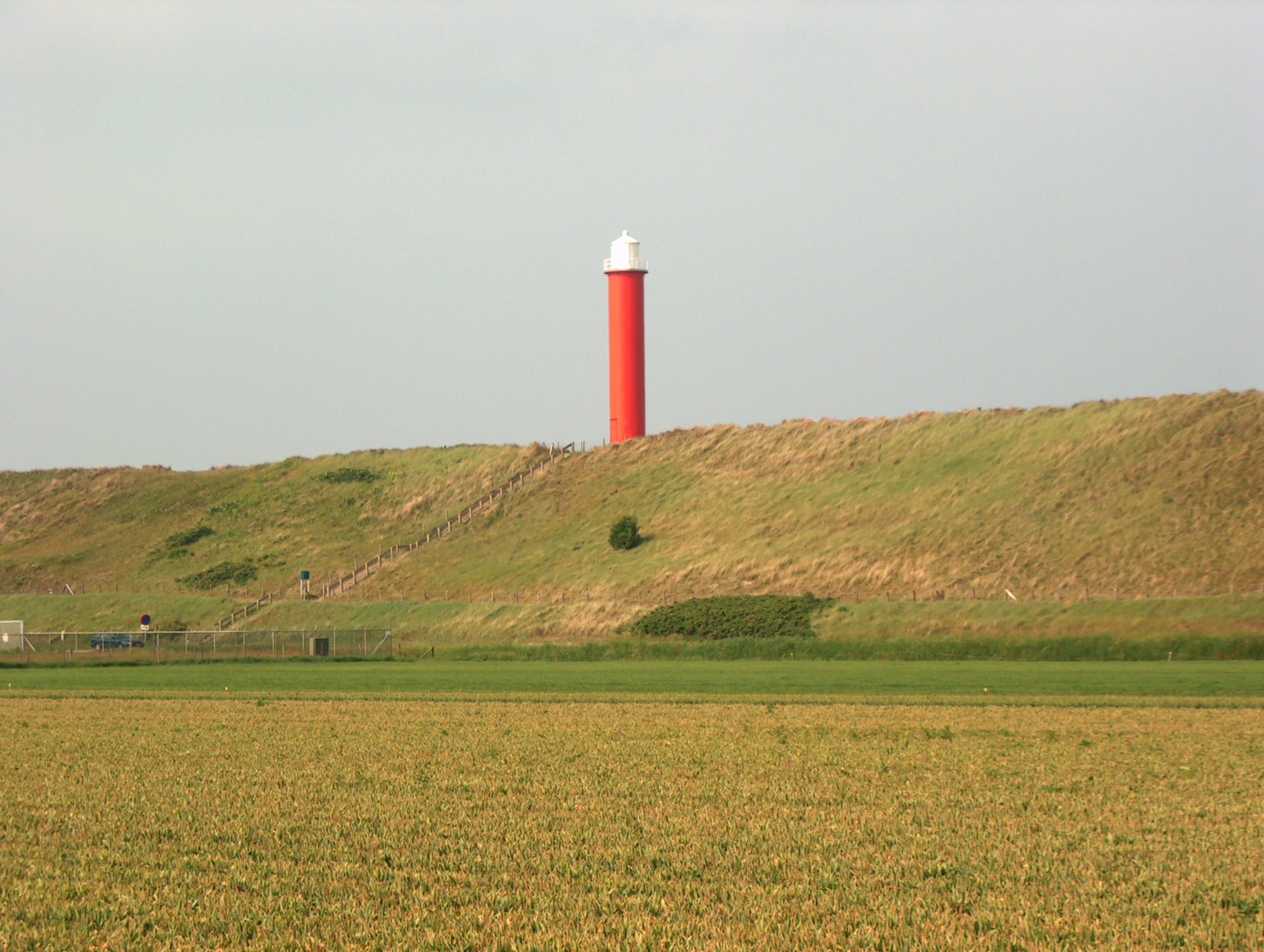
- Location: Den Helder; Netherlands
- Coordinates: 52°52′51.3″N 4°42′53.2″E

Tower
- Constructed: 1871 (first); 1966 (second)
- Construction: steel tower
- Height: 16.8 metres (55 ft)
- Shape: cylindrical tower with balcony and lantern
- Markings: red tower and white lantern

Light
- First lit: 1985 (current)
- Focal height: 31 metres (102 ft)
- Range: white: 11 nautical miles (20 km; 13 mi) red and green: 8 nautical miles (15 km; 9.2 mi)
- Characteristic: Oc WRG 10s.
- Netherlands no.: 1482

Groote Kaap (Great Cape) (also known as the Julianadorp Lighthouse) is a round steel lighthouse painted red with a white light casing on the North Sea coast in the dunes near Julianadorp by the sea, in the municipality of Schagen in the Netherlands. The construction of the tower was completed in 1966. The tower was replaced in 1985.

The tower is 16.8 metres high, and the light has a height of 31 metres above sea level. It is listed with the international number of B0849 and national number of 1482.

== Light ==
- Visibility in nautical miles: white 11; red and green, 8
- Light Character: Oc WRG 10s
- Light source: Halogen, 24V 250W

== See also ==
- List of lighthouses in the Netherlands
