= Noordwijk Lighthouse =

Noordwijk Lighthouse Vuurtoren van Noordwijk aan Zee
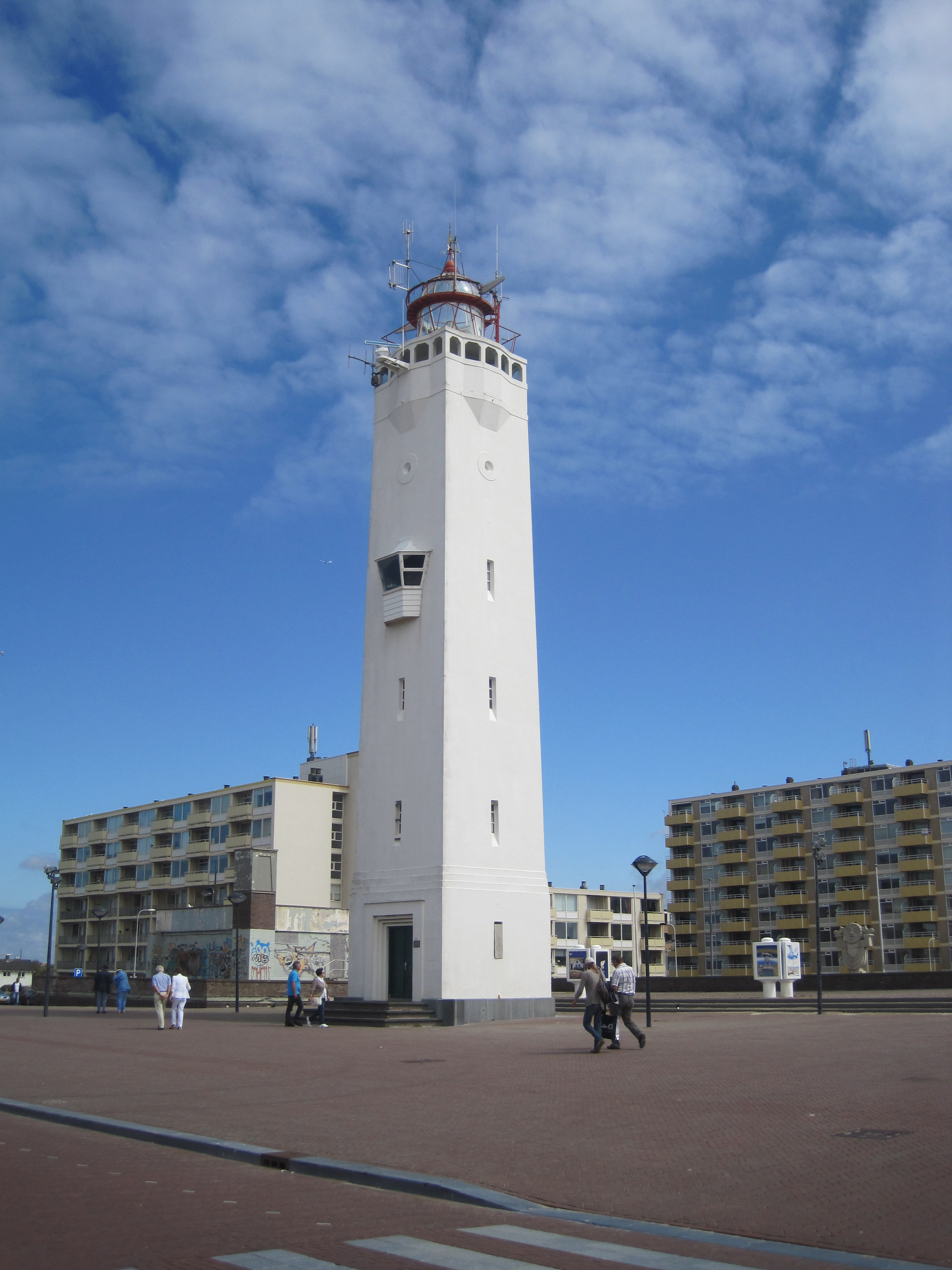
- Noordwijk Lighthouse
- Location: Noordwijk aan Zee
- Coordinates: 52°14′55.4″N 4°26′02.3″E

Tower
- Constructed: 1854 (first)
- Height: 25.5 metres (84 ft)
- Shape: square tower with balcony and lantern
- Markings: white tower and lantern
- Heritage: Rijksmonument

Light
- First lit: 1923 (current)
- Focal height: 33 metres (108 ft)
- Intensity: 38,000 candela
- Range: 18 nautical miles (33 km; 21 mi)
- Characteristic: Oc (3) W 20s.
- Netherlands no.: NL-1324

Noordwijk Lighthouse (in Dutch: Vuurtoren van Noordwijk aan Zee) is a lighthouse located in Noordwijk, South Holland, Netherlands.

== History ==
The first mention of a lighthouse in Noordwijk was in 1444 when fishermen returned home when the sun went down. The light was lit only when fishermen were active at sea. In the 19th century a wooden platform built which was replaced in 1854 by a stone turret. This light was demolished in 1913.

The current tower was built in 1921 as a reconnaissance tower for shipping, and its first lighting was at August 23, 1923. Ten years later the tower was painted white to protect it against the water.

== Lighting ==
The light characteristic is three interruptions per 20 seconds. The pattern is 2x briefly and 1x long. The light has an intensity of 38,000 cd and a visibility of 18 nautical miles (33 km).

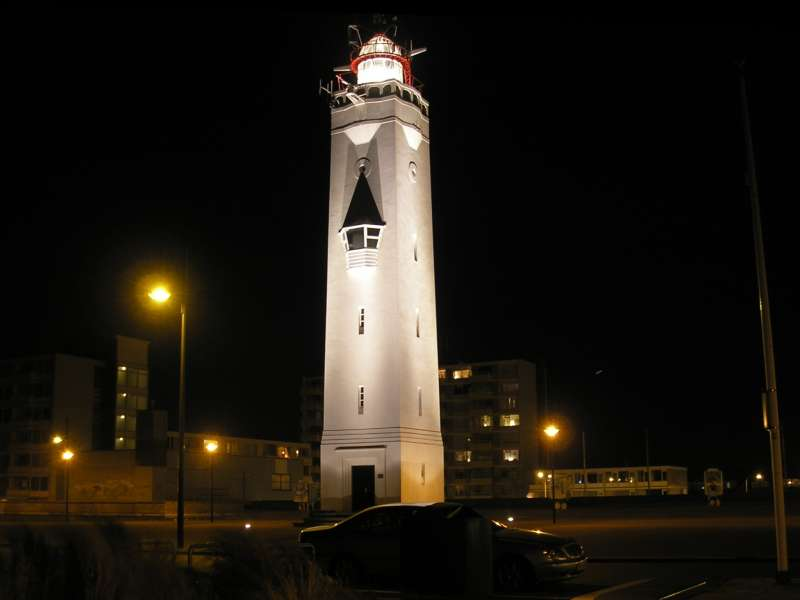
Lighthouse at night

== See also ==
- List of lighthouses in the Netherlands
