= Hellevoetsluis Lighthouse =

Lighthouse in the Netherlands

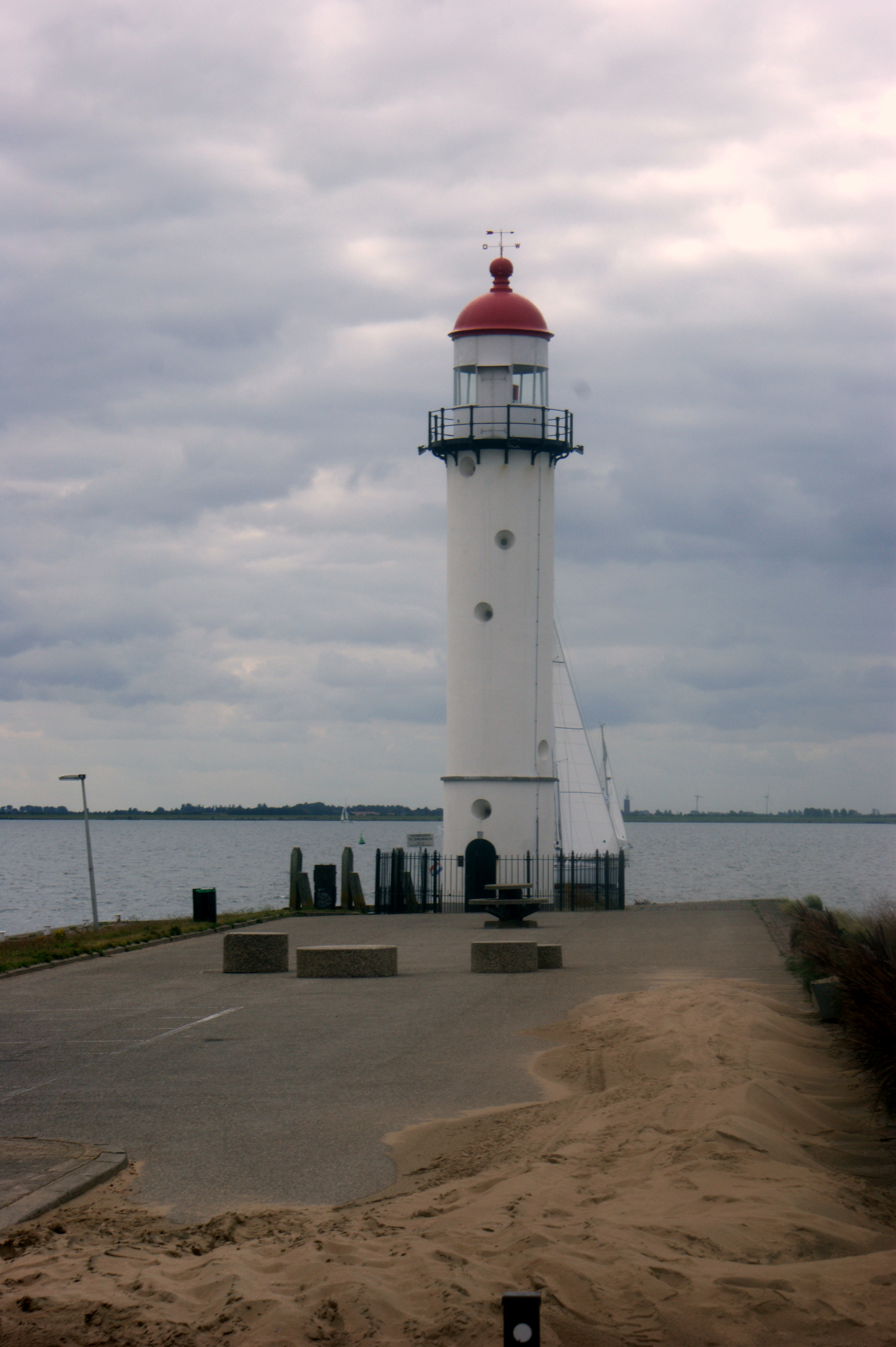
- Location: Hellevoetsluis, Voorne aan Zee, Netherlands
- Coordinates: 51°49′11″N 4°07′40″E

Tower
- Constructed: 1822
- Construction: brick
- Height: 18.1 m (59 ft)
- Shape: cylinder
- Markings: white (tower), red (roof)
- Heritage: Rijksmonument

Light
- Focal height: 17 m (56 ft)
- Intensity: 1,800 candela (white), 450 candela (red), 260 candela (green)
- Range: 11 nmi (20 km; 13 mi) (white), 8 nmi (15 km; 9.2 mi) (red), 7 nmi (13 km; 8.1 mi) (green)
- Characteristic: Iso WRG 10s

The Hellevoetsluis Lighthouse is a lighthouse in Hellevoetsluis, the Netherlands. It is listed as a Rijksmonument since 1982, number 21422. Although the tower is no longer in use as a beacon, the light has not been officially extinguished and the lighthouse is still one of about thirty active light houses in the Netherlands.

== History ==
=== 19th century ===
Until the 19th century, the port of Hellevoetsluis remained an important naval port. Before the lighthouse was built, ships entering the port were warned by a lantern. In 1792 they already found this insufficient, but it was not until 1818 that it was decided to place an 'inner fire' as a beacon at the head of the harbour. This too was no longer sufficient and in 1821, it was decided that a lighthouse could be built. 5,800 Dutch guilders was made available. The next year, on February 23, 1822, contracts were signed and the lighthouse was completed that same year for a sum of only 4,849 Dutch guilders. The design came from Jan Valk and it was built by contractor Klaas van Golvedingen. The original tower was built with bricks and then plastered and painted white. In 1899, a black belt was added directly under the circumference.

=== 20th century ===
In 1901 the tower was drastically renovated. The pointed cone cap was replaced by a spherical cap with a wax embossed sphere. The tower was painted in dark green color. During the renovation the light was extinguished for four months. In 1933, the light, which was then oil-fired, was replaced by electric light. The light was again extinguished during the occupation in World War II. Both because the tower had been partly damaged in the war, and because there was overdue maintenance, it was decided on December 5, 1951, that the light house would be completely restored. Because it became apparent that the cost of repair would be very high, it was considered to have the lighthouse demolished, but this was strongly opposed by the local population. The mayor took the objections against the demolition to the government in The Hague and in 1952 it was decided that the lighthouse could remain. In 1961 the bottom of the tower was tiled up to the ring above the door and finally in 1965 the tower was completely restored.

=== 21st century ===
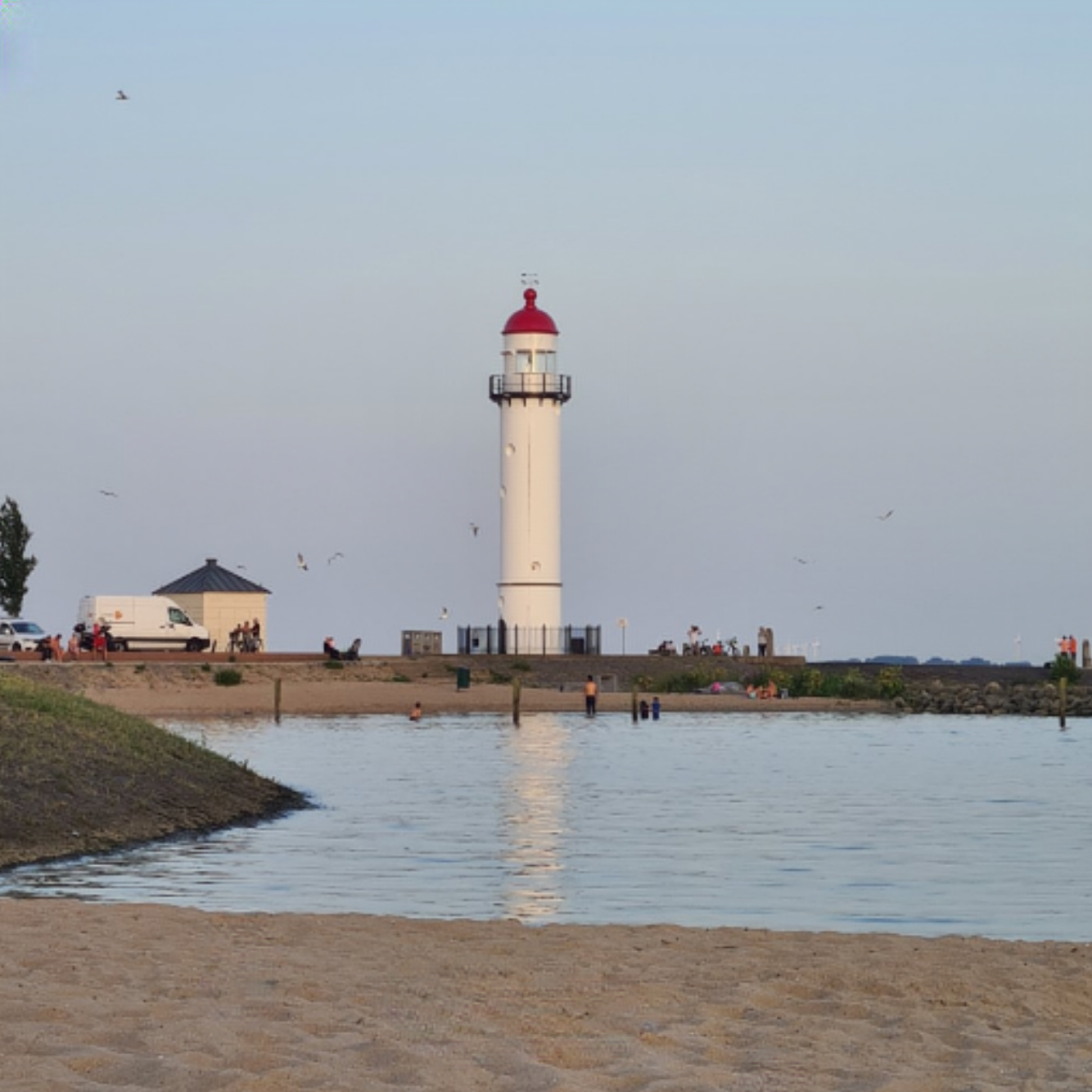
The lighthouse after its new painting in 2021.

In 2005 the local population once again took action, as the tower was in bad shape. Mayor Corstiaan Kleijwegt went to Rijkswaterstaat with about 7,000 signatures. As a result, the tower was fully restored. The current fencing around the tower had also been installed during this year. In 2013, the halogen lighting system has been replaced with LED lighting. In August 2021, the lighthouse was in bad shape and paint was peeling off. Rijkswaterstaat decided to clean, plaster en paint the lighthouse again. About 80 kilos of latex sauce and more than 400 liters of white paint was used. The planned work on the lighthouse was brought forward because of the festivities that would be held in October 2021 in honor of the 400th anniversary of the port.

== See also ==
- List of lighthouses in the Netherlands
