= South Tower =

South Tower may refer to:

- South Tower (Brussels), a building in Brussels, Belgium
- 2 World Trade Center (1971–2001), known as the South Tower of the World Trade Center
  - The South Tower (sculpture), an art piece by Don Gummer based on the collapse of 2 World Trade Center
- South Tower, 10 Hudson Yards, a skyscraper in New York City

== See also ==
- North Tower (disambiguation)
