= Urk Lighthouse =

Lighthouse in Urk, Netherlands

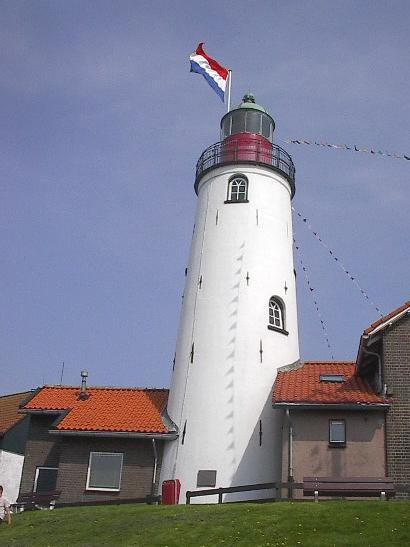
- Urk Lighthouse
- Location: Urk
- Coordinates: 52°39′39.8″N 5°35′31.0″E

Tower
- Construction: brick tower
- Automated: yes
- Height: 18.5 metres (61 ft)
- Shape: tapered cylindrical tower with balcony and lantern
- Markings: White tower, black trim, red lantern with green dome
- Heritage: Rijksmonument, Rijksmonument

Light
- First lit: 1845
- Focal height: 27 metres (89 ft)
- Lens: Fresnel lens
- Intensity: 40,000 candela
- Range: 18 nautical miles (33 km)
- Characteristic: Fl 5s
- Netherlands no.: 1956

Urk Lighthouse is a lighthouse in Urk at the eastern banks of the IJsselmeer in the Netherlands. From 1617 a coal fire was used for the local fishermen as well as for the ships sailing from Amsterdam to the North Sea. The current lighthouse station was established in 1837. The tower was built in 1845 as a round brick tower attached to a keeper's house. A Fresnel lens is still in use. The lighthouse was restored in 1972 and declared a national monument of the Netherlands in 1982. The tower can be visited during guided tours.

== See also ==
- List of lighthouses in the Netherlands
