= List of lighthouses in Friesland =

This is a list of lighthouses in Friesland, province in the Netherlands. Five lighthouses are on the West Frisian Islands. Most of these lighthouses are subject to historic preservation. The lighthouses of Terschelling, Vlieland, Ameland and the red tower of Schiermonnikoog still function as lighthouses.

== Lighthouses ==
Location	Year	Height	Historic preservation since	Image
Ameland	1881	55 meter	1982	Ameland
Harlingen	1922	24 meter	1980	Harlingen
Lemmer	1910,1994	9 meter		Lemmer
Schiermonnikoog	1854	37 meter	1980	Schiermonnikoog
Schiermonnikoog	1854	31 meter	1980	Schiermonnikoog watertoren
Stavoren	1885	15 meter	1999	Stavoren
Terschelling	1594	54 meter	1965	Brandaris
Vlieland	1876	17 meter	1980	Vlieland
Workum		13 meter		Workum
