= Paard van Marken =

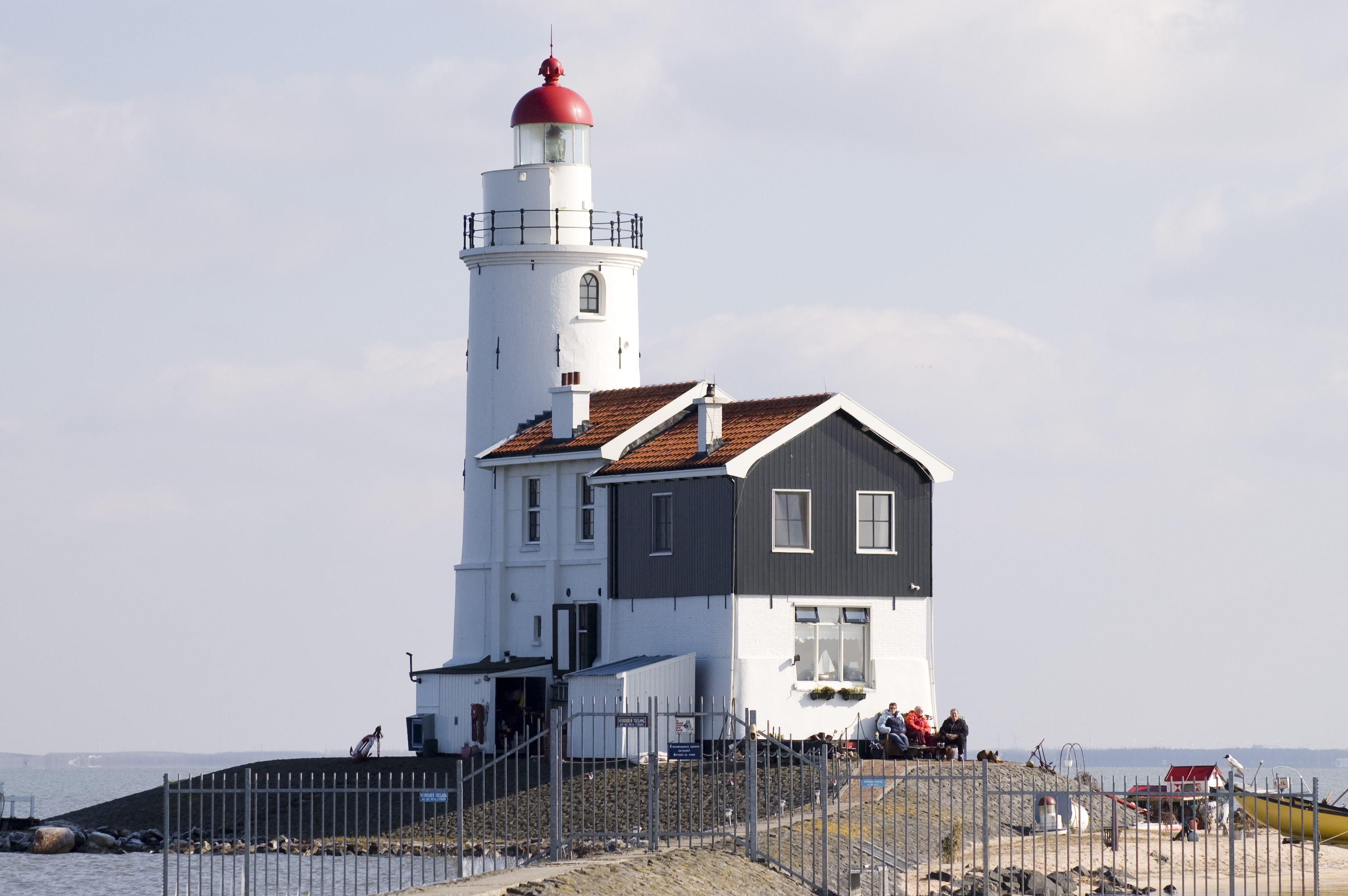
- Paard van Marken in 2006
- Location: Marken, Waterland, Netherlands
- Coordinates: 52°27′35.3″N 5°8′20.9″E

Tower
- Constructed: 1700 (first)
- Construction: brick tower
- Height: 15.5 metres (51 ft)
- Shape: cylindrical tower with balcony and lantern
- Markings: white tower and lantern, red lantern dome
- Heritage: Rijksmonument

Light
- First lit: 1839 (current)
- Focal height: 16 metres (52 ft)
- Intensity: 4,400,000 cd
- Range: 9 nautical miles (17 km)
- Characteristic: white light occulting once every 8 s.
- Netherlands no.: NL-1684

The Paard van Marken (English: Horse of Marken) is a lighthouse on the Dutch peninsula Marken, on the IJsselmeer. It was built in 1839 by J. Valk. A primitive lighthouse had been on the location since the early 18th century; the current lighthouse has been a listed building (Rijksmonument) since 1970.

The lighthouse is inhabited and thus cannot be visited.

== See also ==
- List of lighthouses in the Netherlands
