= Stenen Baak =

Deactivated lighthouse in South Holland province, Netherlands

Stenen Baak (Brielle)
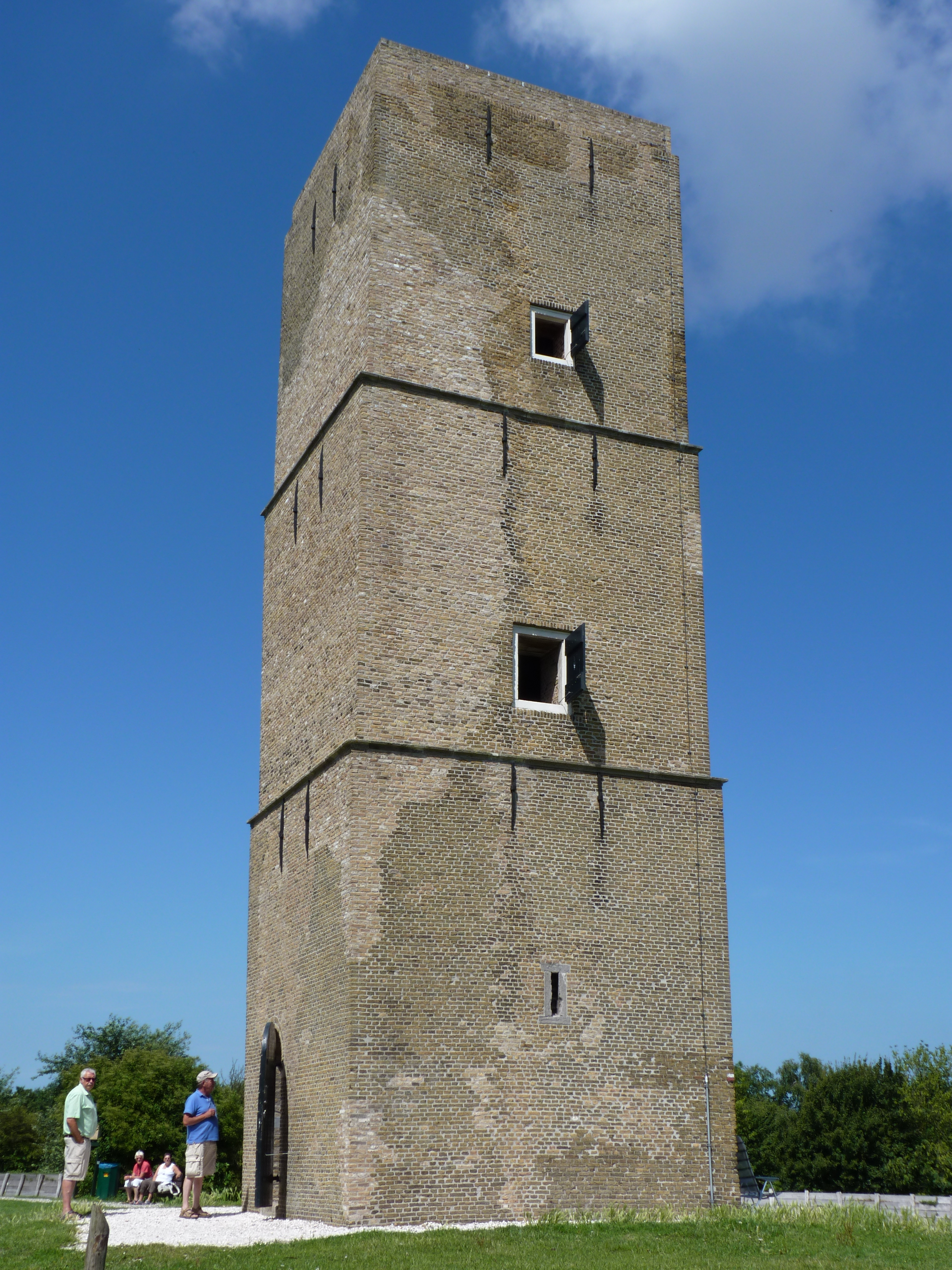
- Stenen Baak
- Location: Oostvoorne, in the Dutch province of South Holland
- Coordinates: 51°55′40″N 4°08′26″E

Tower
- Constructed: 1650
- Construction: brick
- Height: 15 metres (49 ft)
- Shape: square tower
- Operator: Historisch Museum den Briel
- Heritage: Rijksmonument

Light
- Deactivated: 1850
- Range: 4 nautical miles (7 km)

Stenen Baak is a now-deactivated lighthouse northeast of Oostvoorne, near to the town of Brielle, in the Dutch province of South Holland. In several nautical sources of the 19th Century it is also referred to as Stone Beacon or Stone Baak. It protected the entrance to the Brielle harbour, a safe haven protecting ships from the tides and waters of the North Sea. The harbour is formed by the island of Voorne-Putten and the Brielse Meer and the rivers Oude Maas, Spui and Haringvliet. Brielle received city rights in 1306, developed the harbour during this time up until the fiefdom was added to Holland in 1371. The lighthouse itself was added in 1650. A fixed light during its time of operation, the lighthouse was visible in good weather up to a distance of four miles. It was deactivated in 1850.

== See also ==
- List of lighthouses in the Netherlands
