= Maritime Museum Rotterdam =

Maritime museum in Rotterdam, Netherlands

Coordinates: 51.9175°N 4.4821°E

- Maritiem Museum Rotterdam
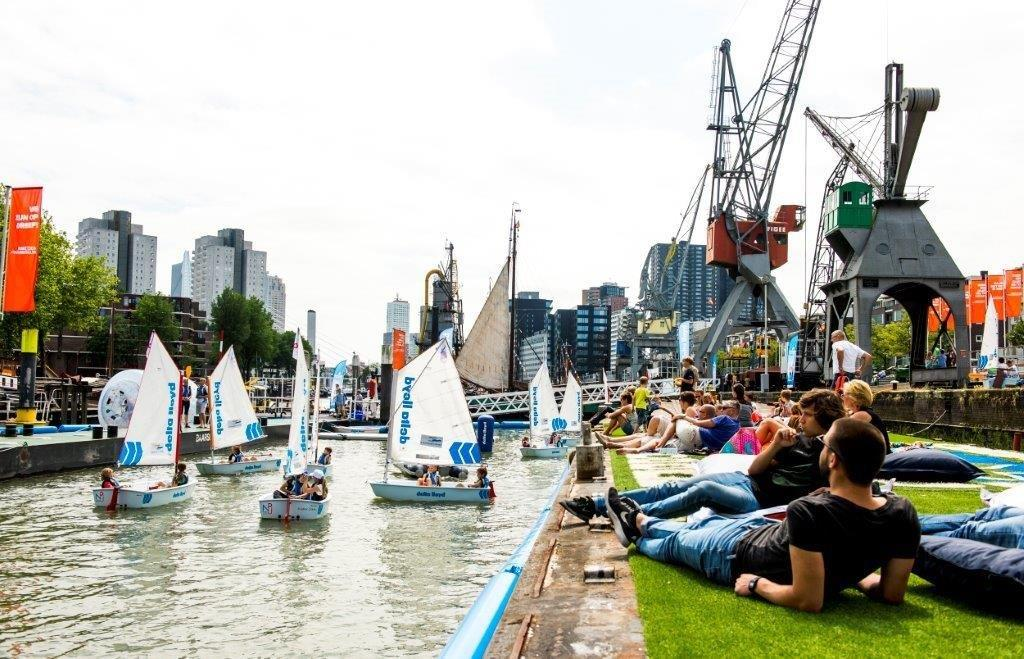
- Established: 1874
- Location: Rotterdam, Leuvehaven 1
- Director: B. Boer
- Website: www.maritiemmuseum.nl

The Maritime Museum Rotterdam is a maritime museum in Rotterdam, The Netherlands. Dedicated to naval history, it was founded in 1874 by Prince Henry of the Netherlands.

Next to the Maritime Museum lies the open-air Maritime Museum Harbour, which merged with the Maritime Museum in 2014. The Maritime Museum Harbour contains a collection of historic vessels and cranes which are maintained in working condition.

== Collection and exhibitions ==
The Museum Collection contains 850,000 objects from six centuries of maritime history.

The Maritime Museum includes both permanent and changing exhibitions designed for three generations: children, their parents and grandparents. The exhibitions show the maritime influence on everyday life.

=== Masterpieces (Topstukken) ===
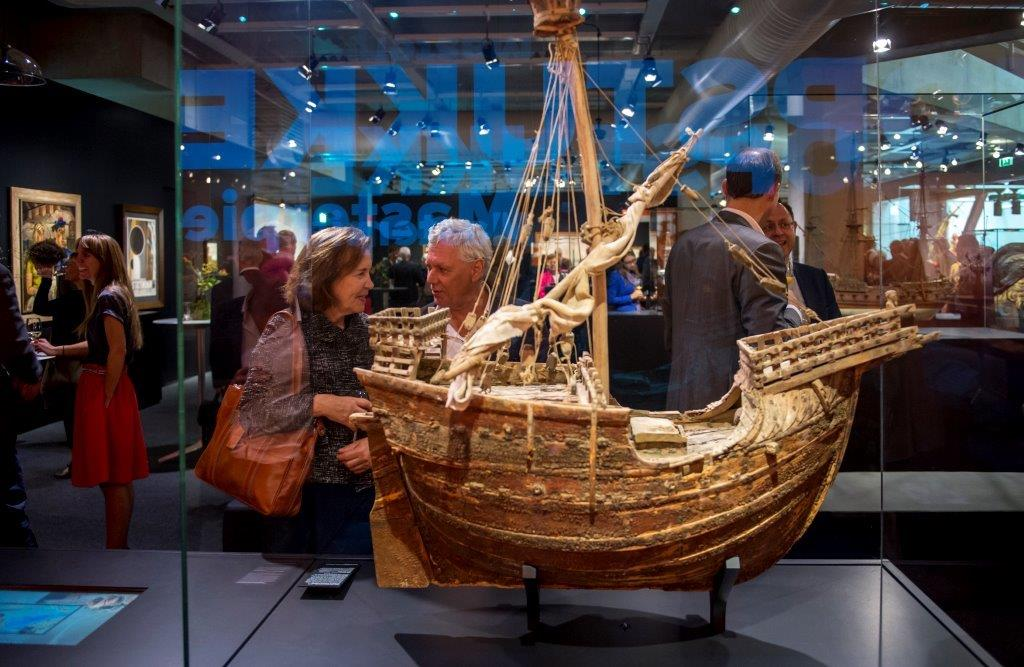
Mataró model

'Masterpieces’ by the Maritime Museum is showcasing twenty-five unique objects from its centuries-old collection. The most important piece is the Mataró model. It is the oldest model ship in Europe, dating back more than six centuries. And it has been made extremely accurately.

The exhibit also includes the Itinerario by Jan Huygen van Linschoten which contains the maritime secrets of the Portuguese. Furthermore, it includes the pen-and-ink drawings of Willem van de Velde and sea charts of the Corpus Christi collection by the master cartographer Joan Blaeu. This is a collection of East India Company charts that lay hidden in England for three hundred years and came to the Maritime Museum in 2006 after being purchased for millions.

=== Maritime Museum Harbour ===
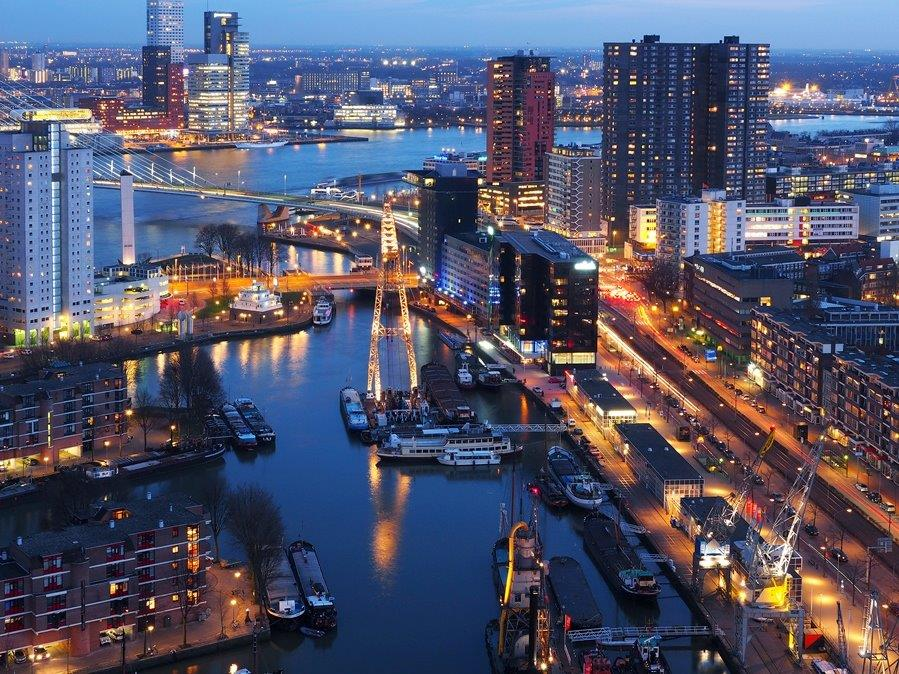
Maritime Museum Harbour

A former attraction was the 19th-century ironclad ram ship HNLMS Buffel, which was moored outside of the museum. The ship was moved to Hellevoetsluis in 2013 (due to cost cuts) where it will be exploited by the Stichting Museumschip de Buffel to preserve this ship for the generations to come.

The Maritime Museum Harbour includes the red cast iron Low Light of the Hook of Holland, which formerly stood at the entrance to the Nieuwe Waterweg (New Waterway). Furthermore, it includes a wide range of steam tugs, a steam driven sheerleg and a working grain elevator. A diverse range of historical inland vessels is also exposed here. Visitors are able to enter most of the ships. In the summer the Museum organizes cruises through the city of Rotterdam with these ships.

=== Offshore experience ===
This exhibit simulates the search for oil, gas, wind energy and renewables at sea. It showcases the work done by drillers, crane operators, windmill specialists and helicopter pilots.

=== Professor Splash (Professor Plons) ===
In this exhibition children between 4 and 12 years old learn about the maritime world by playing. As they play, they learn about various types of ships, working in the port, navigation and how products such as their own toys are transported by ship from all over the world to the Netherlands.

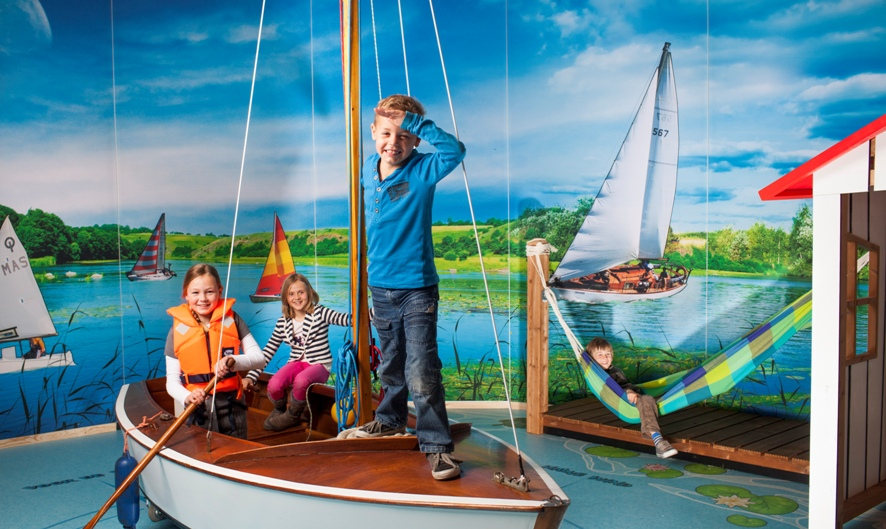
Professor Splash

== Sources ==
- Dicke, Matthijs; Pothoven, Boudewijn; van der Zouwen, Annelies (2014). Highlights Maritime Museum Rotterdam. Zutphen: Walburg Pers. ISBN 9789057303777.
