= De Ven =

De Ven Lighthouse Enkhuizen
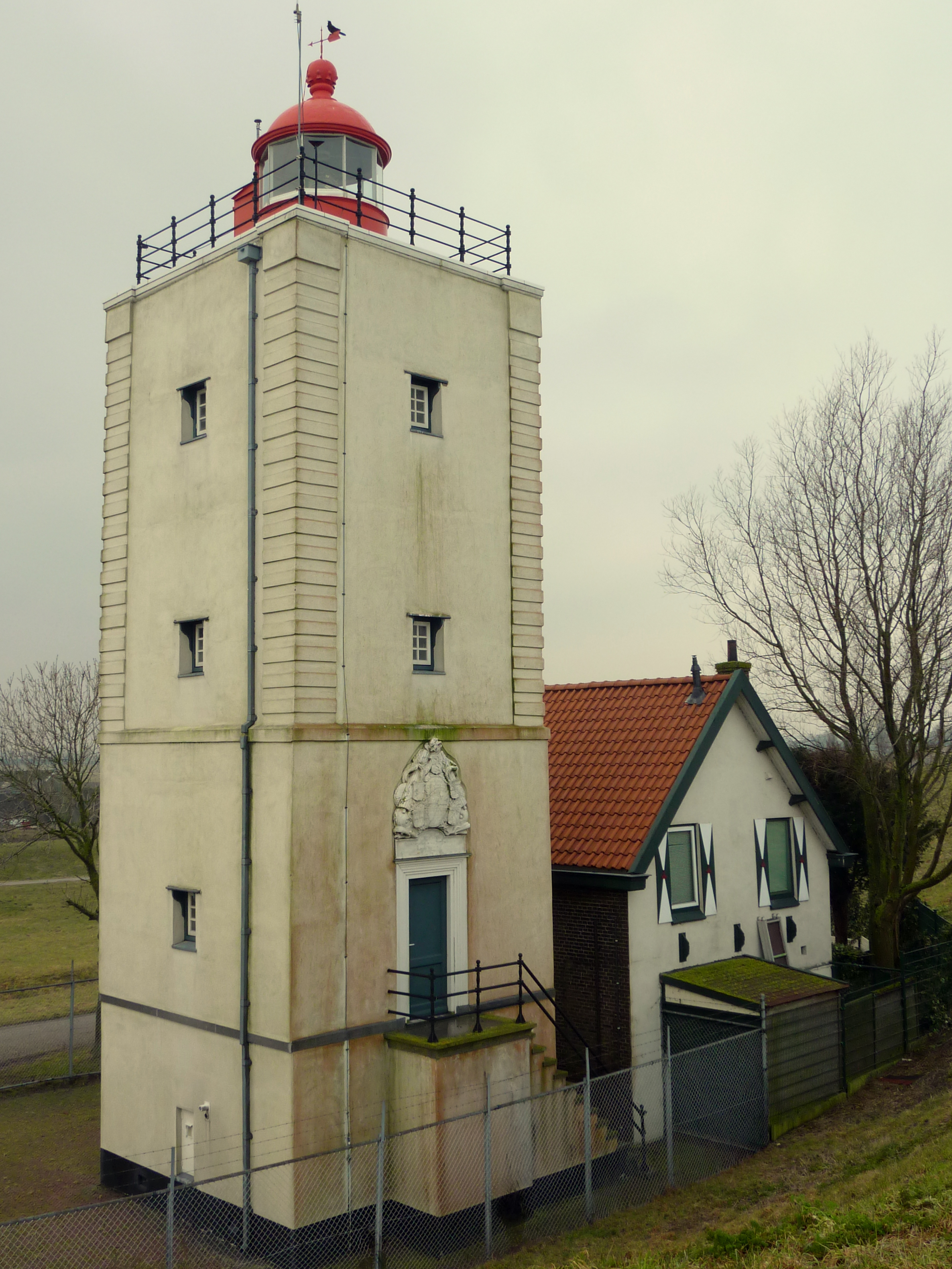
- De Ven, Enkhuizen
- Location: Oosterdijk; Enkhuizen; Netherlands
- Coordinates: 52°44′31.4″N 5°16′56.1″E

Tower
- Constructed: 1700
- Construction: brick tower
- Height: 15 metres (49 ft)
- Shape: square tower with balcony and lantern
- Markings: white tower, red lantern
- Heritage: Rijksmonument

Light
- First lit: 14 November 1839
- Deactivated: briefly in 2009
- Focal height: 18 metres (59 ft)
- Intensity: 4,200 cd
- Range: 11 nautical miles (20 km)
- Characteristic: L Fl W10s.
- Netherlands no.: NL-1618

De Ven is a lighthouse in Oosterdijk, a village in the municipality of Enkhuizen, Netherlands. Built in 1699–1700, it is one of the oldest lighthouses in the Netherlands.

== History ==
De Ven was one of the three lighthouses indicating the route from the Waddenzee to Amsterdam; the other two were at Marken and Durgerdam. De Ven is the only one remaining of the three original lighthouses.

In 1819 the lighthouse burned down, with only the outer walls still standing. An emergency solution functioned for twenty years. In 1834, the light was equipped with a Fresnel lens. For years, a second tower next to the lighthouse passed on information to passing ships about wind and weather. Since 1966 the lighthouse is a Rijksmonument.

The light was extinguished on 16 April 2009 since the light characteristic no longer properly marked the shipping route to Lemmer. After protests the light was reinstated with a different characteristic, on 21 October 2009. The lighthouse is not open to the public.

== See also ==
- List of lighthouses in the Netherlands
