= Oosterdijk, Netherlands =

Oosterdijk
- Hamlet
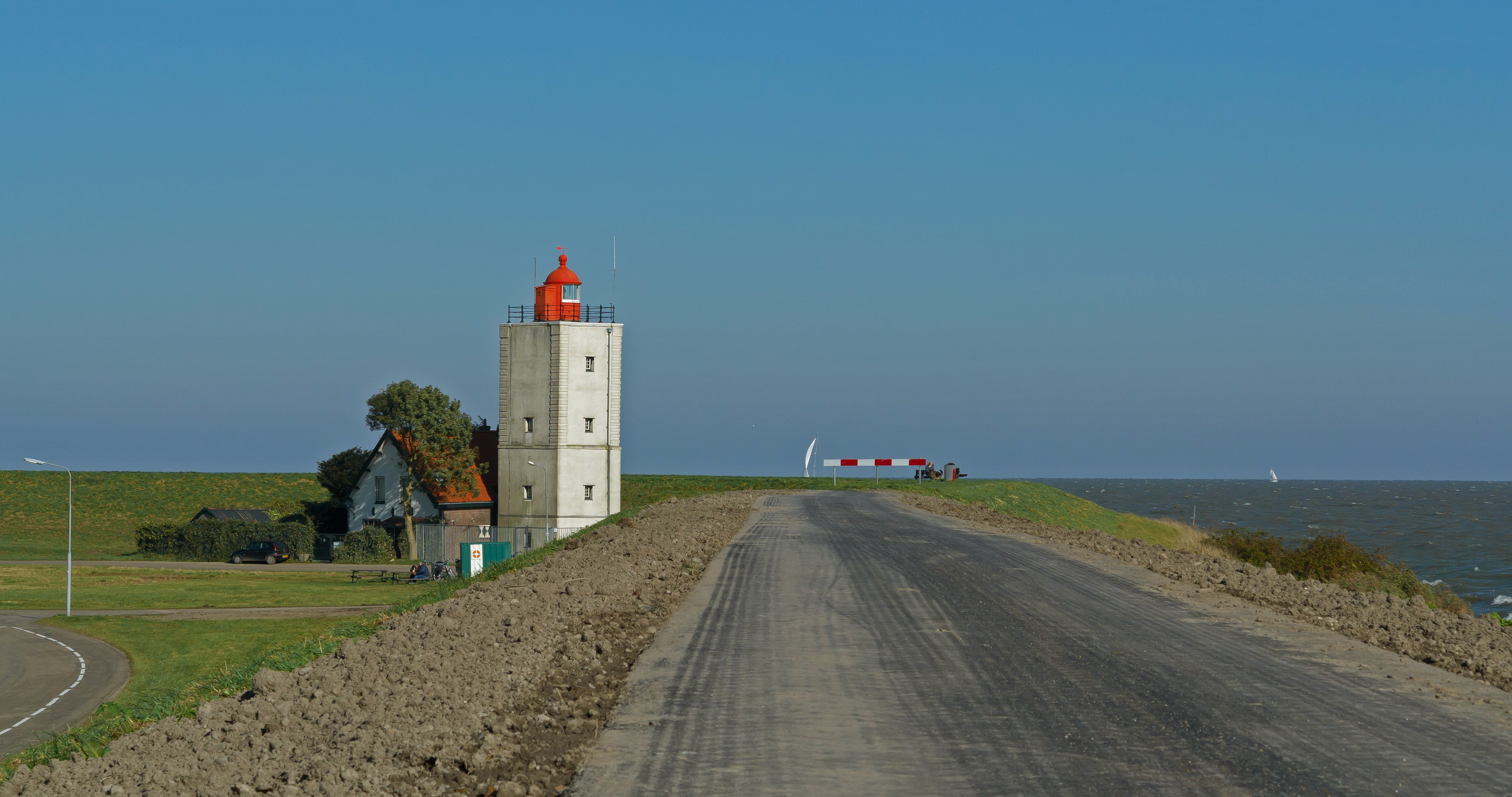
- Lighthouse de Ven

- Location in the Netherlands Location in the province of North Holland in the Netherlands
- Coordinates: 52°44′41″N 5°16′8″E
- Country: Netherlands
- Province: North Holland
- Municipality: Enkhuizen
- Time zone: UTC+1 (CET)
  - Summer (DST): UTC+2 (CEST)
- Postal code: 1601
- Dialing code: 0228

Oosterdijk is a hamlet located on the IJsselmeer in the northern part of the municipality Enkhuizen, in the Dutch province of North Holland. Oosterdijk borders the village Andijk. The lighthouse De Ven is located in Oosterdijk.

Oosterdijk is not a statistical entity, and the postal authorities have placed it under Enkhuizen. It has place name signs. Oosterdijk was home to 85 people in 1840. Nowadays, it consists of about 35 houses.
