= North Tower (lighthouse) =

Lighthouse in Friesland, Netherlands

North Tower Lighthouse Schiermonnikoog
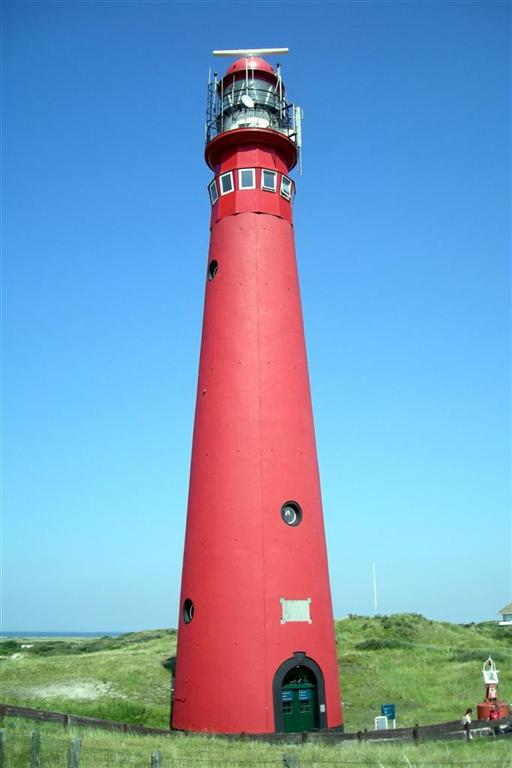
- North Tower, Schiermonnikoog
- Location: Schiermonnikoog; Netherlands
- Coordinates: 53°29′13.0″N 6°8′47.5″E

Tower
- Constructed: 1854
- Construction: brick, dimension stone
- Height: 36 metres (118 ft)
- Shape: tapered cylindrical tower with balcony and lantern
- Markings: red tower and dome, white lantern
- Heritage: Rijksmonument

Light
- Focal height: 44 metres (144 ft)
- Lens: third order Fresnel lens
- Intensity: 2,500,000 cd
- Range: 28 nautical miles (52 km)
- Characteristic: Fl (4) W 20s.
- Netherlands no.: NL-2192

The North Tower is the unofficial name for one of the lighthouses on the Dutch island Schiermonnikoog, one of the Frisian Islands, on the edge of the North Sea; the other is the South Tower. It was built by H.G. Jansen & A. van Rhyn, and was activated in 1854. From the tower, weather reports are issued for the coastal waters. In 1998 it was painted red.

== See also ==
- List of lighthouses in the Netherlands

== Gallery ==
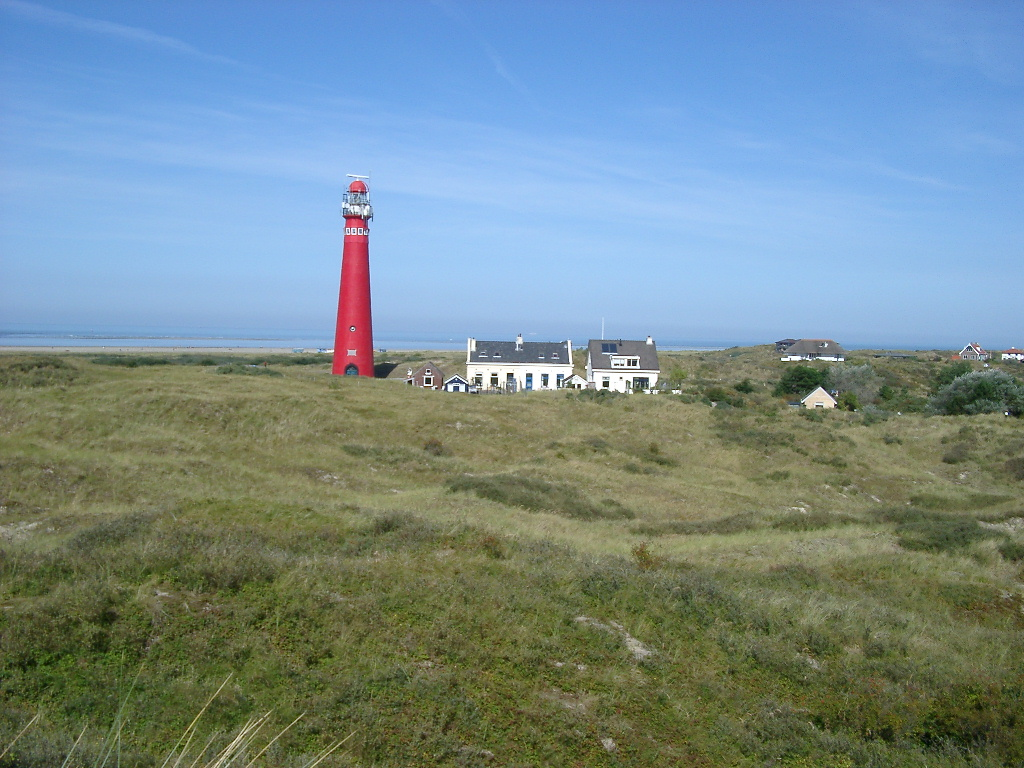

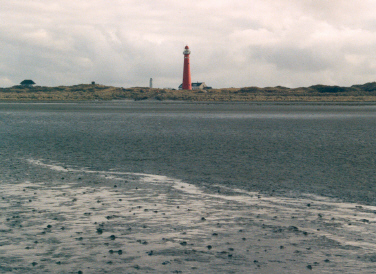

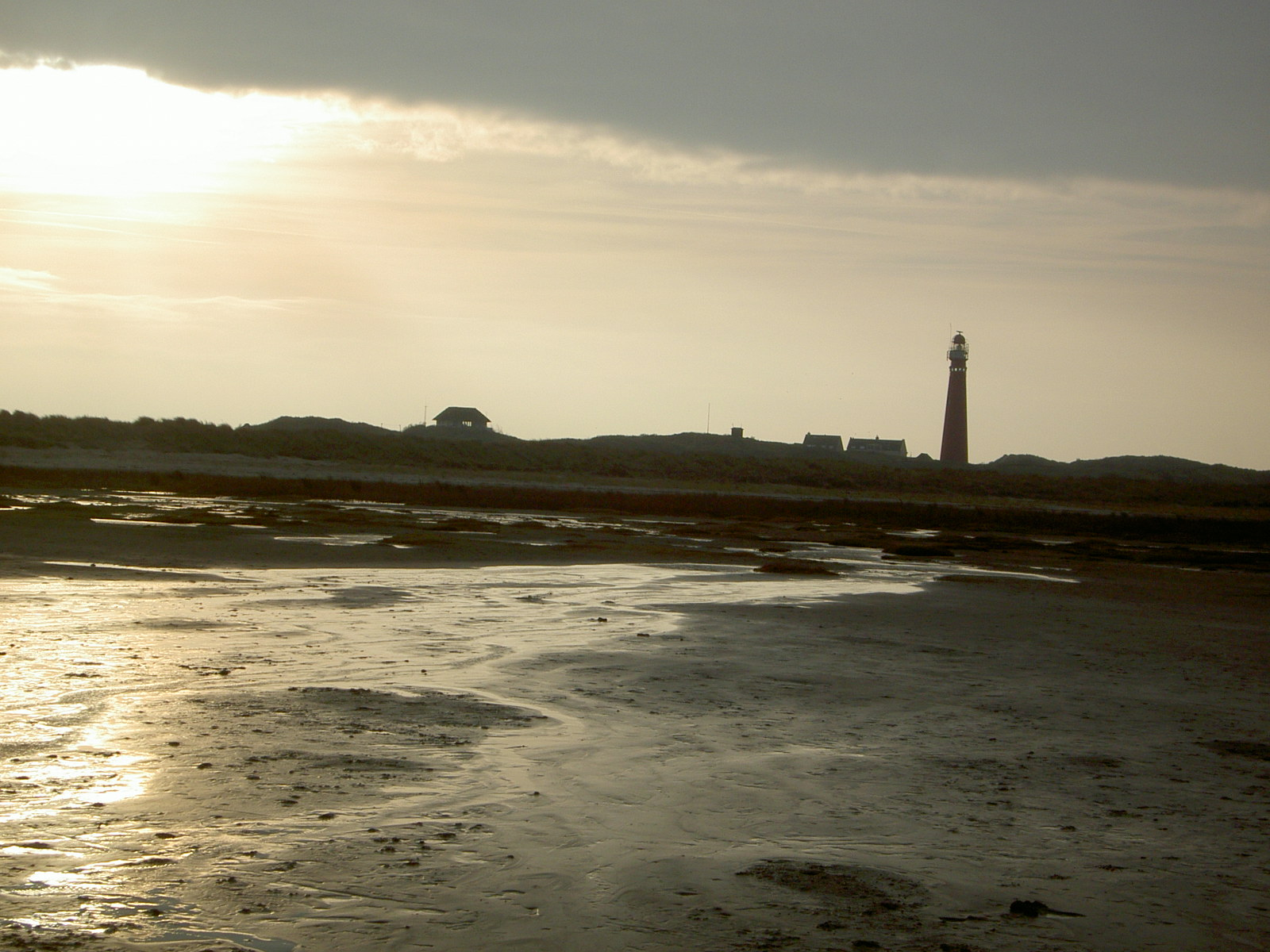
