= Low Light of the Hook of Holland =

Vuurtorens van Hoek van Holland
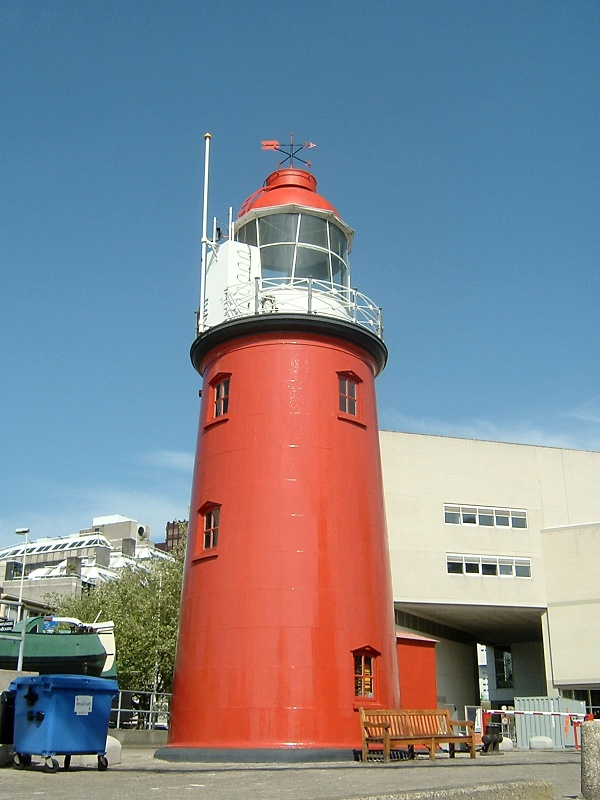
- The old "low light" is now in the Harbor museum of Rotterdam
- Location: Rotterdam, Netherlands (Formerly at 51.970745°N 4.12384°E)
- Coordinates: 51.916799°N 4.482384°E

Tower
- Constructed: 1899
- Height: 13.4 metres (44 ft)

Light
- Deactivated: 1967

The Low Light of the Hook of Holland (Lage licht van Hoek van Holland) is a lighthouse that once stood at the Hook of Holland, but has since been dismantled and reassembled near the Rotterdam maritime museum.

== Origin ==
An octagonal brick tower 9 metres (29 ft 6 in) in height was built on the site of the low light in 1893, with a higher tower behind it. It was designed by A.C. van Loon. Coming from the sea, the low light would be seen first, then the high light 544 metres (595 yd) behind it. When the two were aligned vertically the ship was on the correct course to sail the Nieuwe Waterweg (New Waterway) leading to the Port of Rotterdam. However, it was soon obvious that the low light was too low, and it was replaced by a 15-metre (49 ft 3 in) round cast iron tower, the last cast iron lighthouse to be built in the Netherlands.

== History ==
The red cast iron tower was built in 1899 by Penn & Bauduin of Dordrecht. It is made of many cast iron components bolted together. There are four floors and 42 steps. At first the tower had a 2,000 candlepower (1962 candela) gas light. In 1913 this was replaced by a 12,000 candlepower gas light. In 1921 the light was replaced by a 20,000 candlepower electric light.

In 1967 the light was turned off and the tower painted grey. The construction of Europoort had extended the shore line, and the two lights were now too far from the waterway entrance. A temporary arrangement of spotlights on a scaffold was erected, and in 1974 nine modern concrete lighthouses replaced the old coastal lights.

In 1977 the tower was transported in two parts to Leuvehaven in Rotterdam, and in 1990 it was erected in the Maritime museum in Rotterdam. It was repainted to its original reddish-brown color. A similar tower to the old low light used to stand in Kijkduin. In 2004 this tower was transported by Chinook helicopter to the original site of the old low light.

In 2006 a petition to return the old low light to its original site gained 2,000 signatures.

== Gallery ==
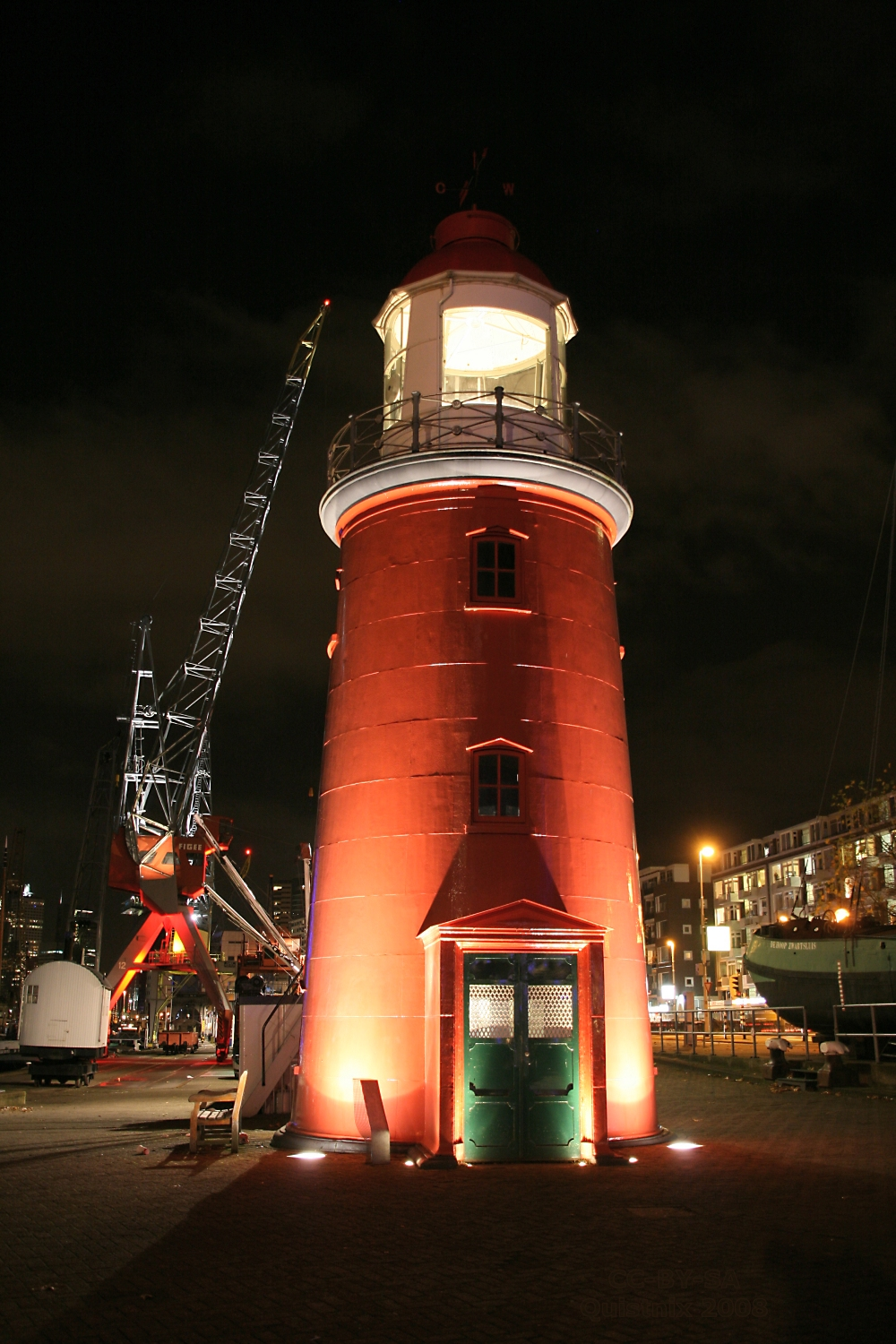
At night - 2008

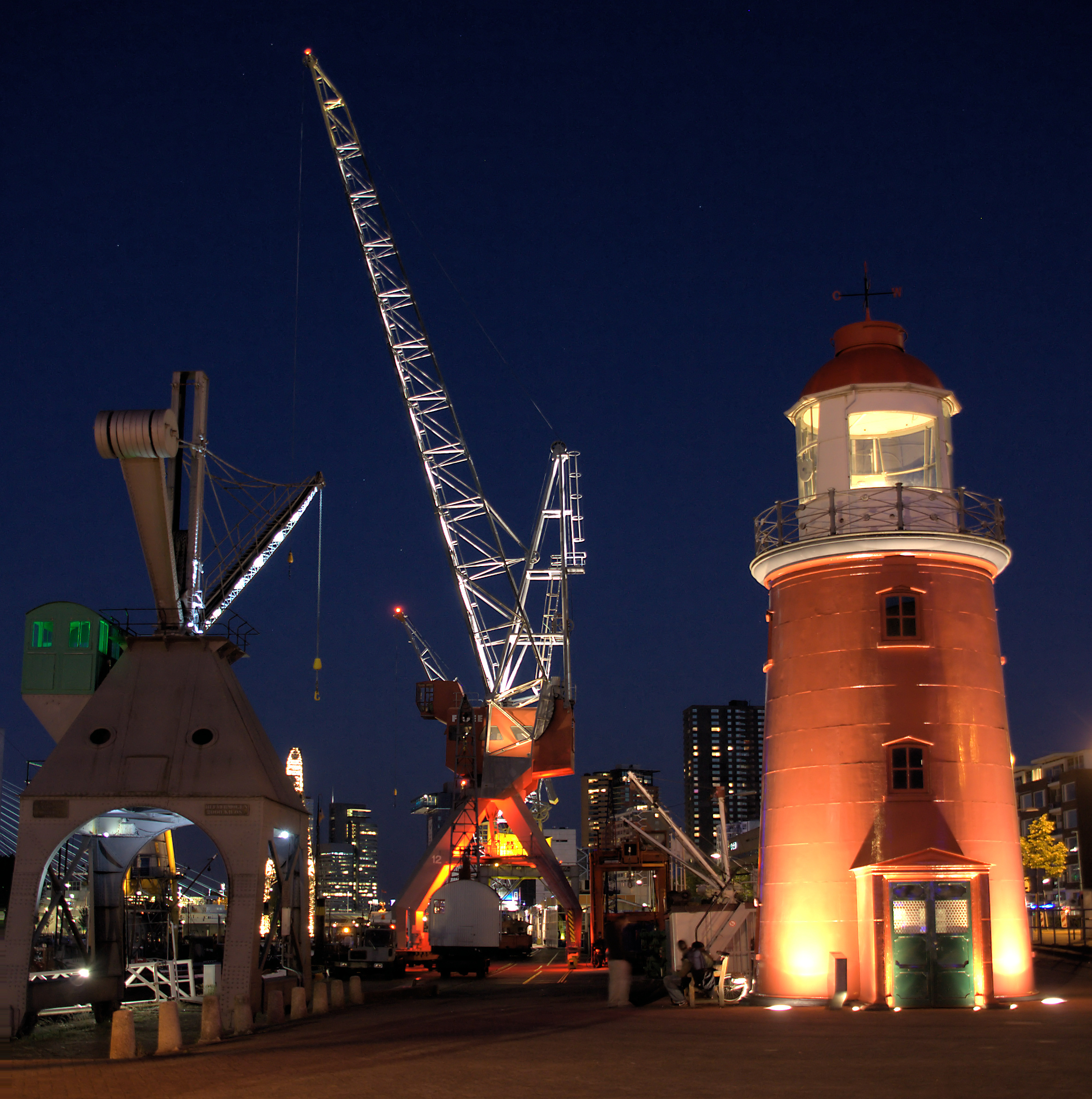
Harbor Museum at night

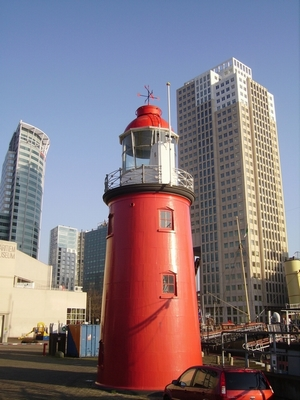
2008

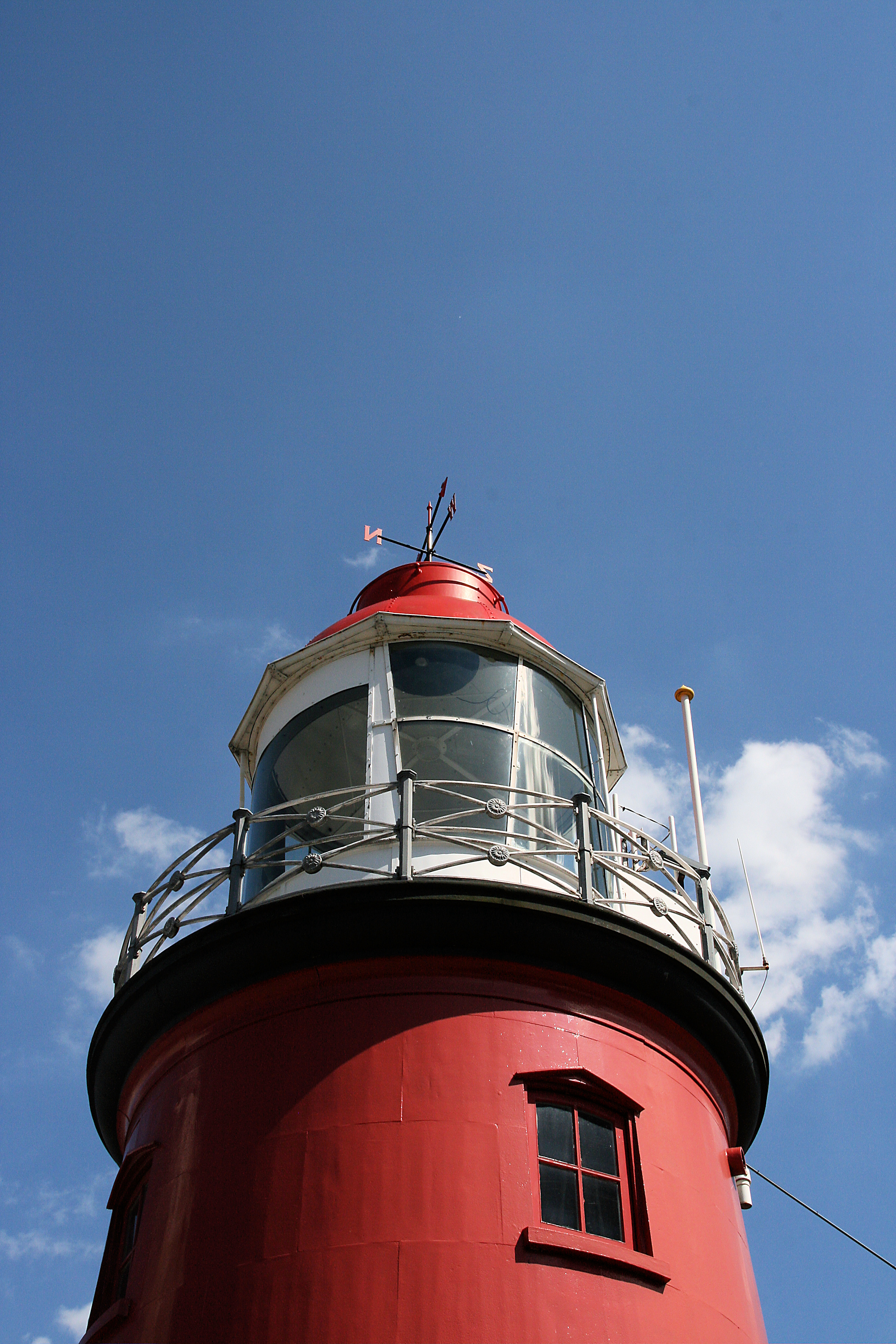
Light - 2009

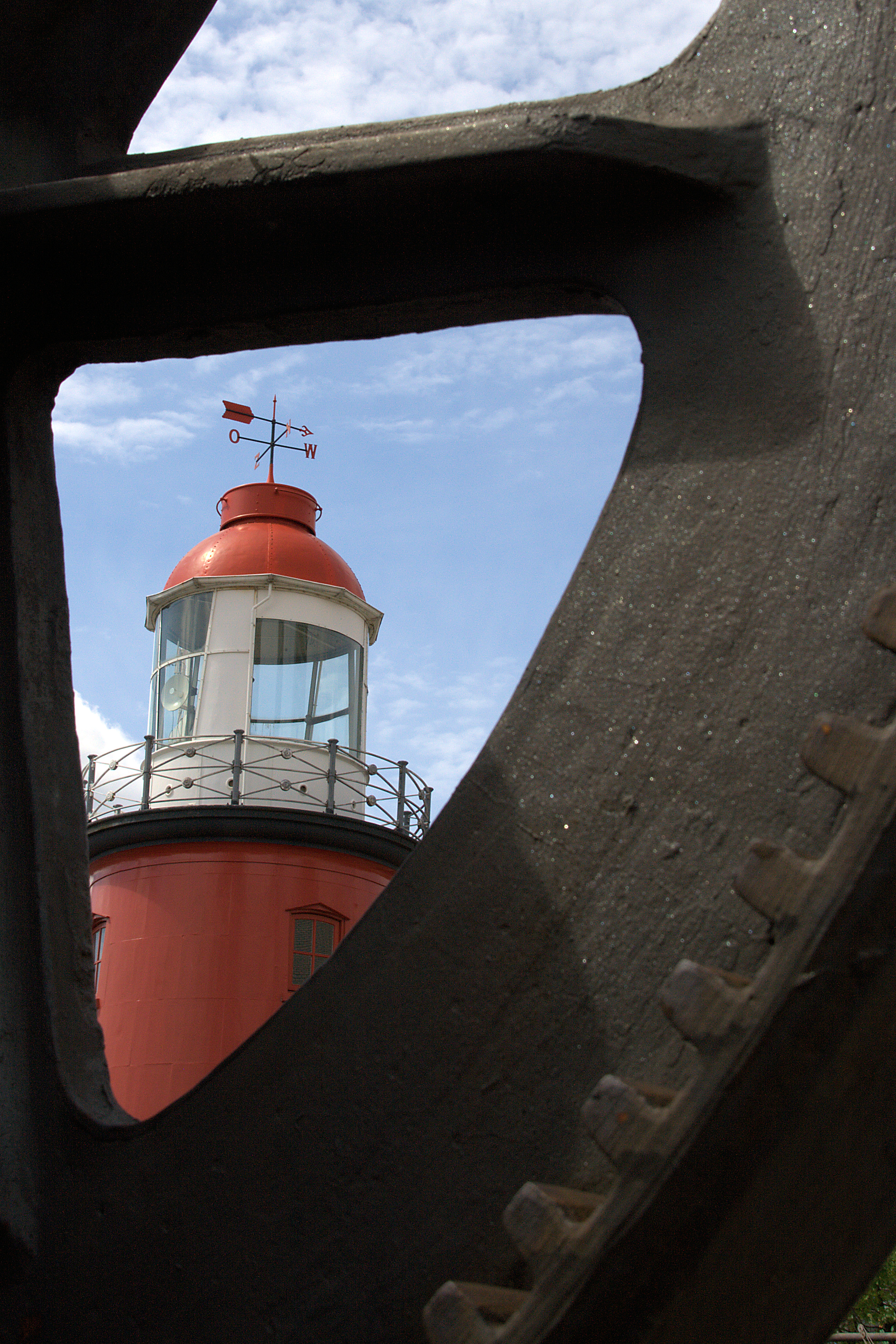
2009
