= Harlingen Lighthouse =

Lighthouse in Friesland, Netherlands

Harlingen Lighthouse Vuurtoren van Harlingen
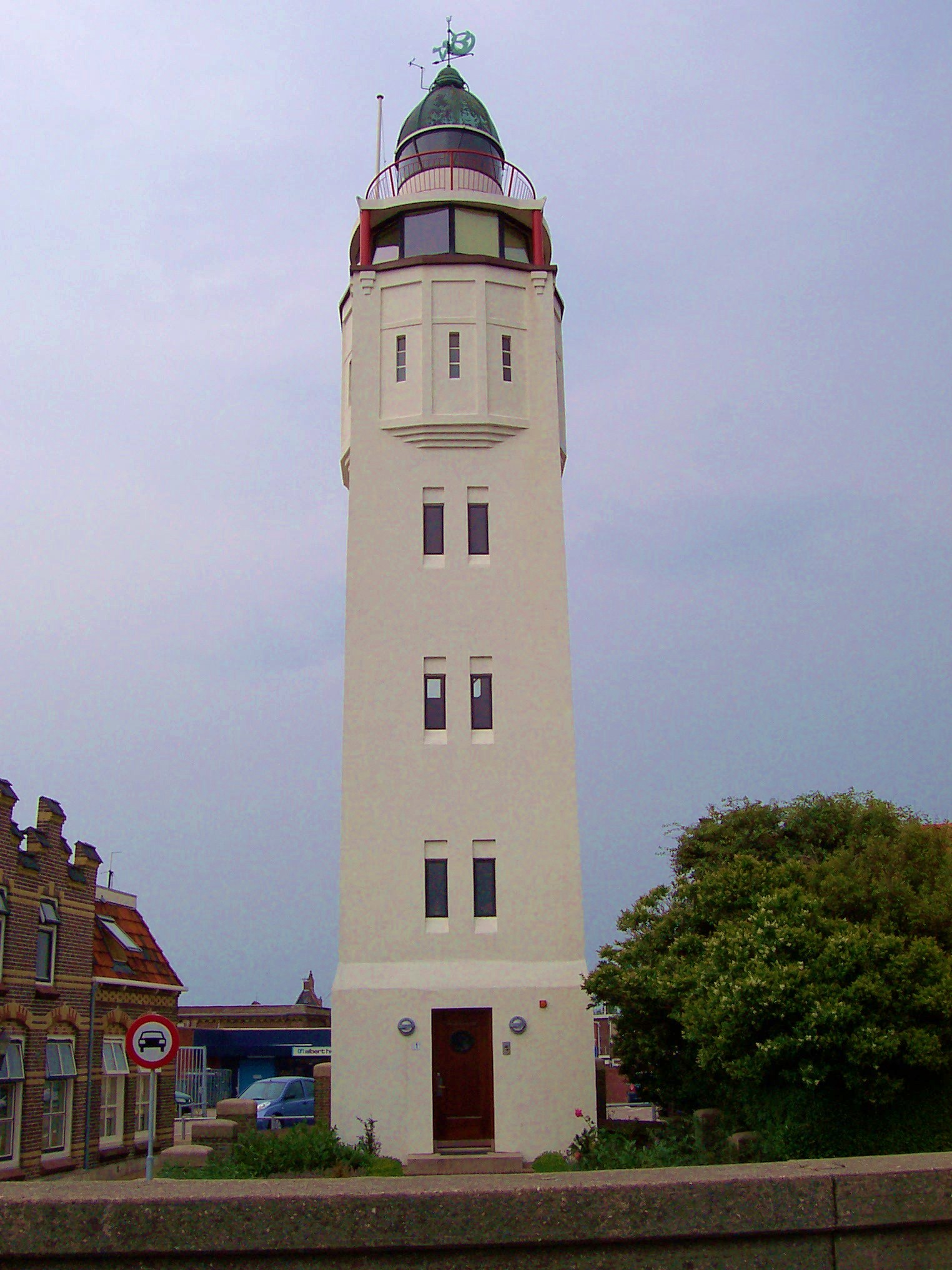
- Harlingen Lighthouse
- Location: Harlingen, Friesland, Netherlands
- Coordinates: 53.173844°N 5.41181°E

Tower
- Constructed: 1920-1922
- Construction: brick and concrete
- Height: 24 metres (79 ft)
- Shape: square tower with gallery and lantern
- Markings: white tower, black dome lantern and red reel
- Operator: Vuurtoren van Harlingen
- Heritage: Rijksmonument

Light
- First lit: 1922
- Deactivated: 1998

The Harlingen Lighthouse (Vuurtoren van Harlingen) is a deactivated lighthouse in the town of Harlingen, Friesland, Netherlands, that is now used as hotel accommodation.

== Description ==
The Harlingen lighthouse is in the center of the Harlingen docks. The same site has been used for at least two earlier lighthouses. A square tower on a fortress was built around 1750 and demolished in 1872. A hexagonal red wooden tower with white bands was operated between 1904 and 1921.

The current lighthouse was designed by architect C. Jelsma and built between 1920 and 1922. The highest point is 24 metres (79 ft) above mean high water. The tower is square, built of stone and steel. The beacon has an Art Deco design. It came into service in 1922, and the light was finally extinguished in 1998. Harlingen lighthouse was part of a network of twenty lights along the Dutch coast, eighteen of which remain operational. The channels and harbor mouth had been adjusted so that this lighthouse was no longer needed.

Between 1998 and 1999 the lighthouse was restored by architect B. Pietersma. The lighthouse is now privately owned and provides a single hotel suite on three levels that can accommodate two people.

== Gallery ==
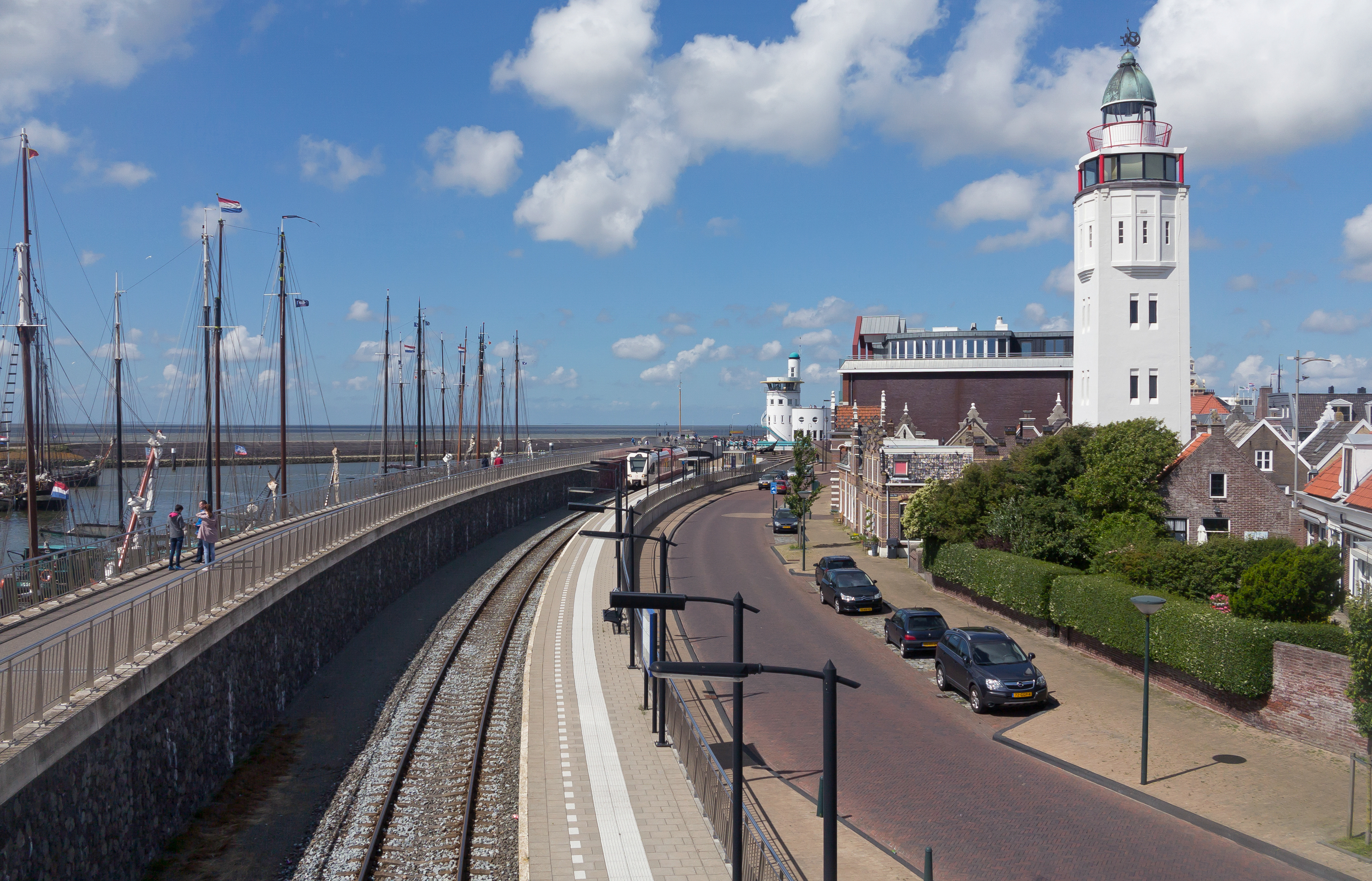
2016

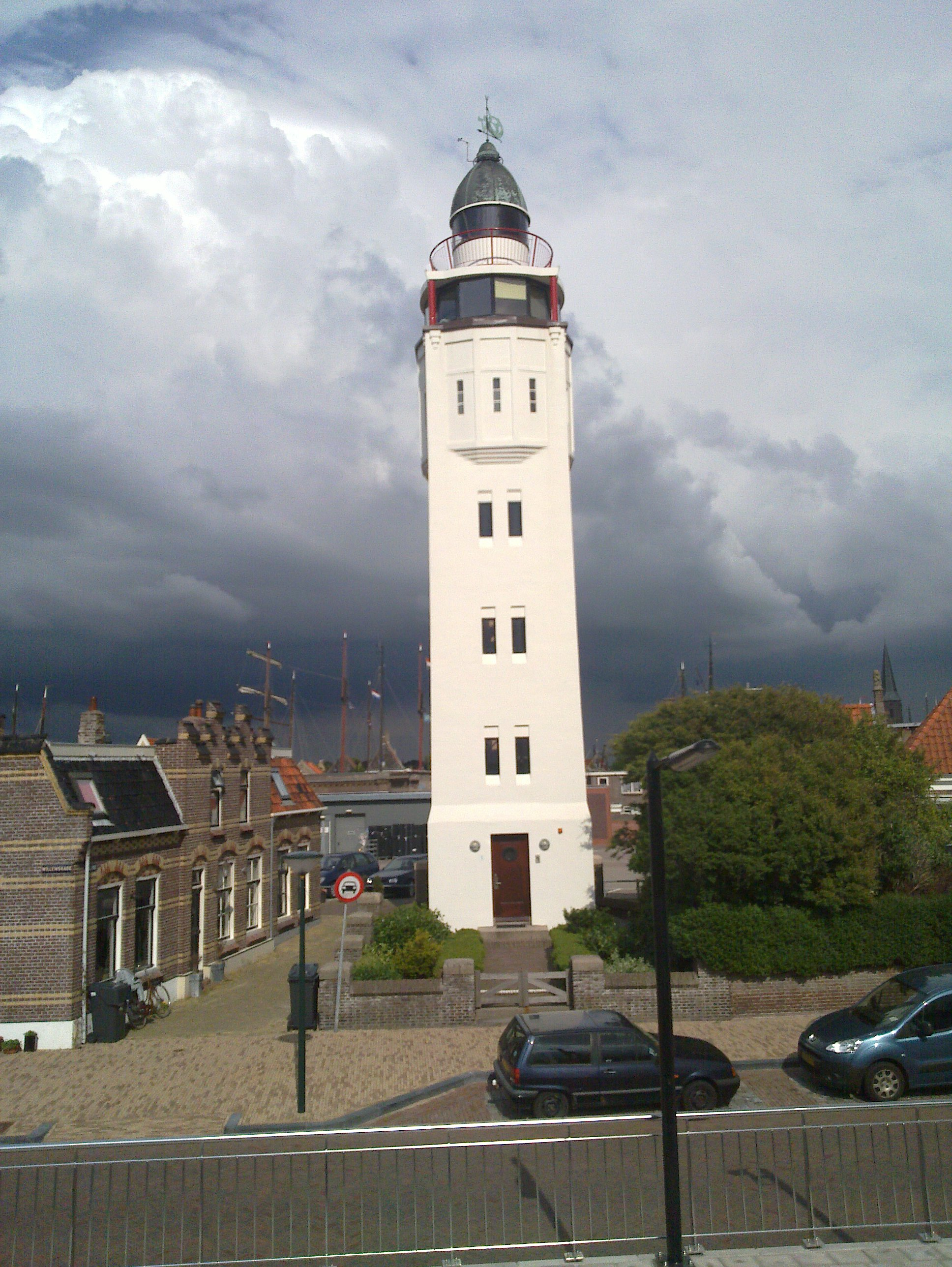
2011

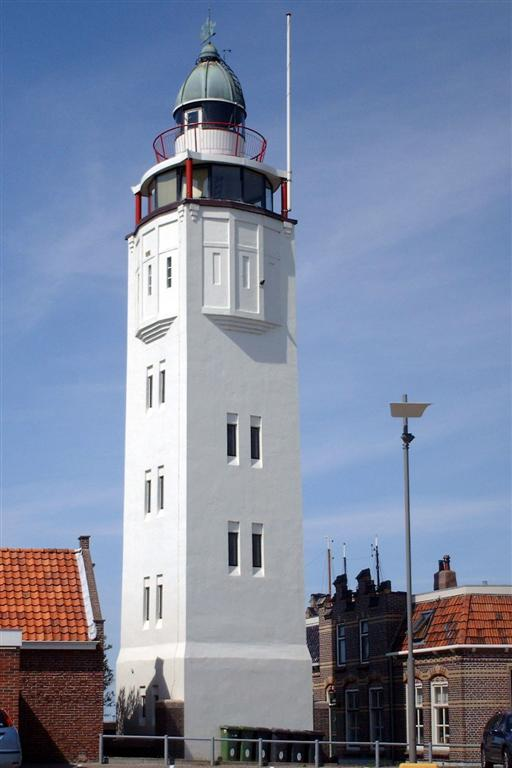
2007

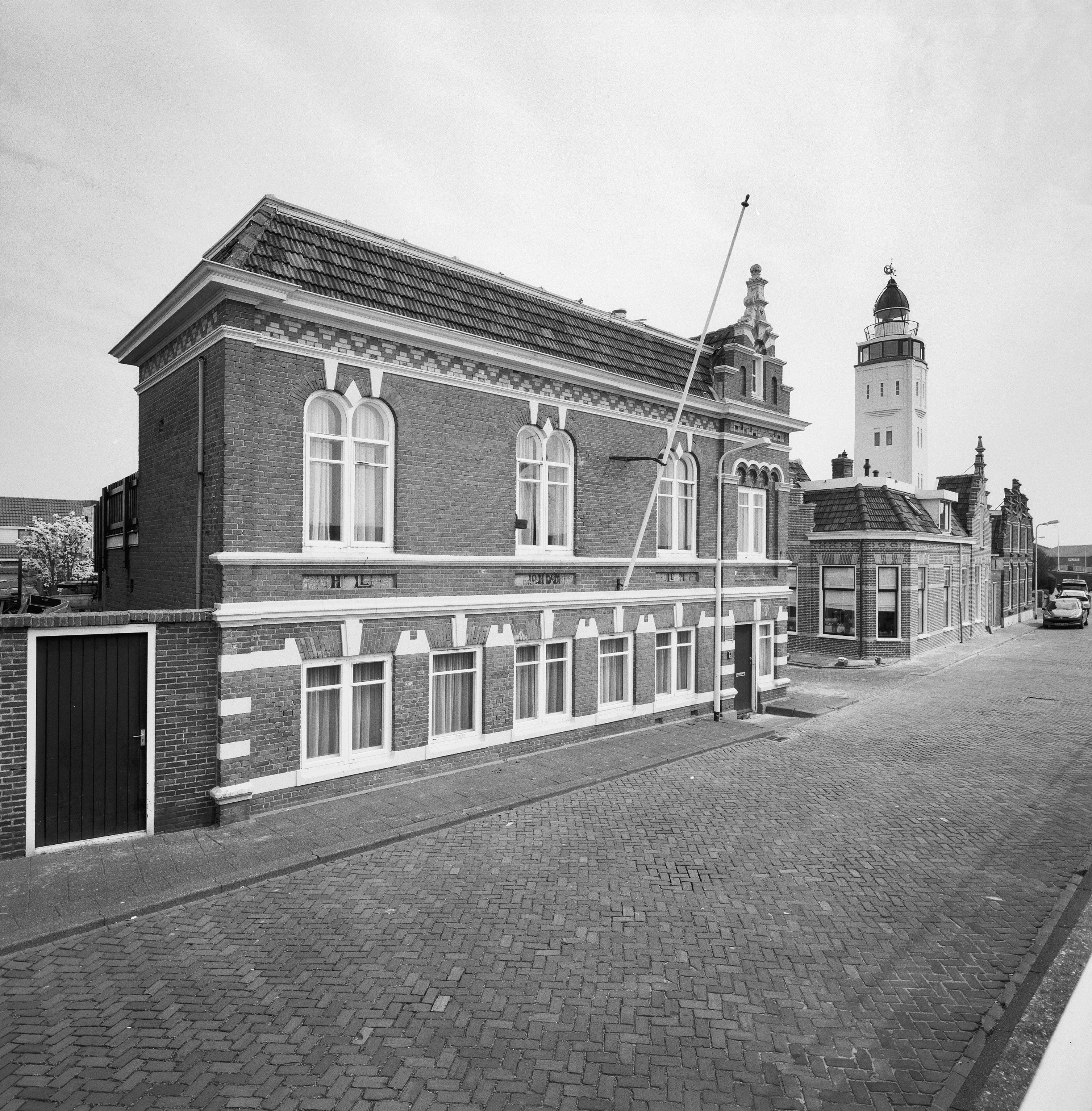
2000

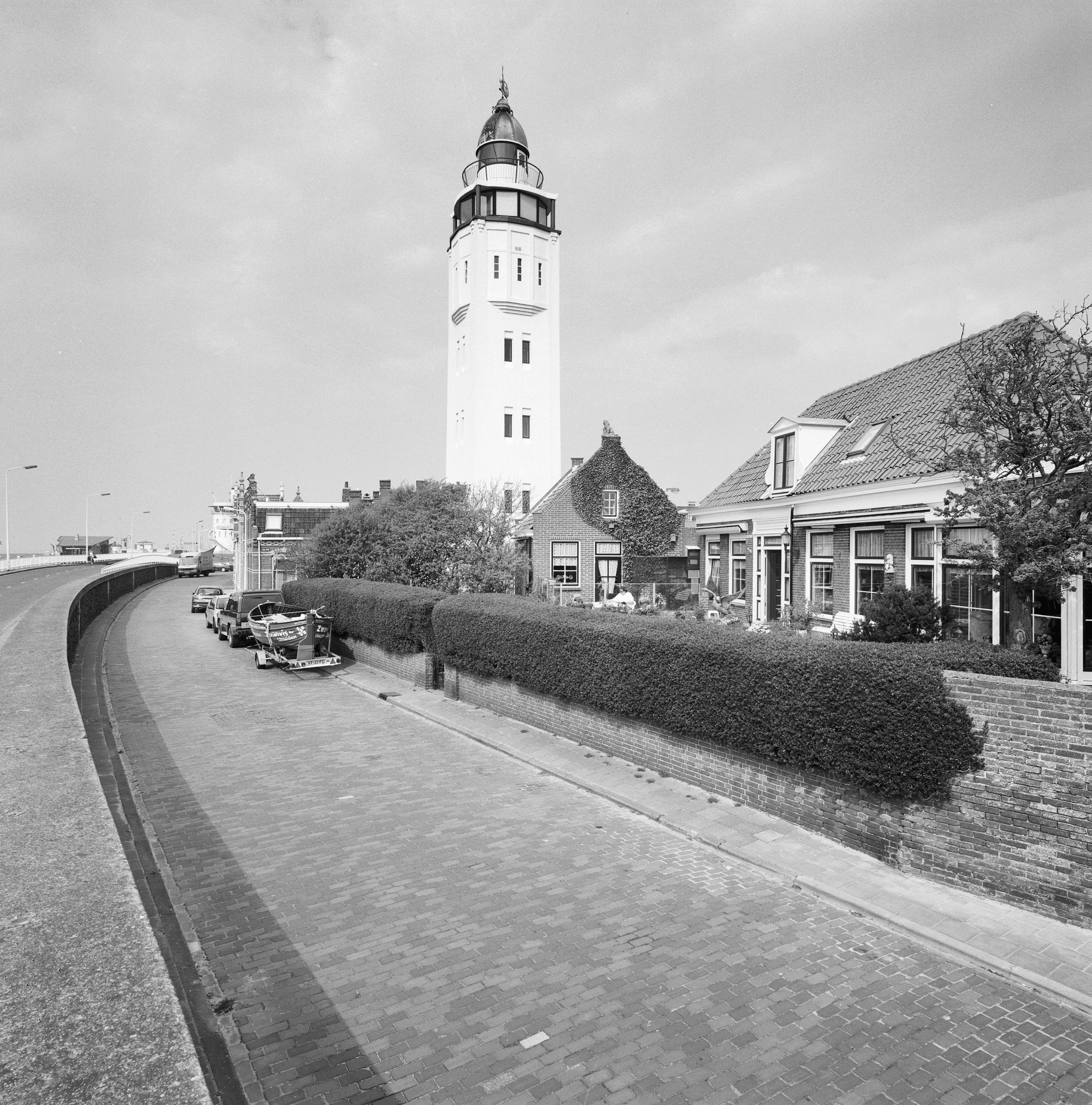
2000

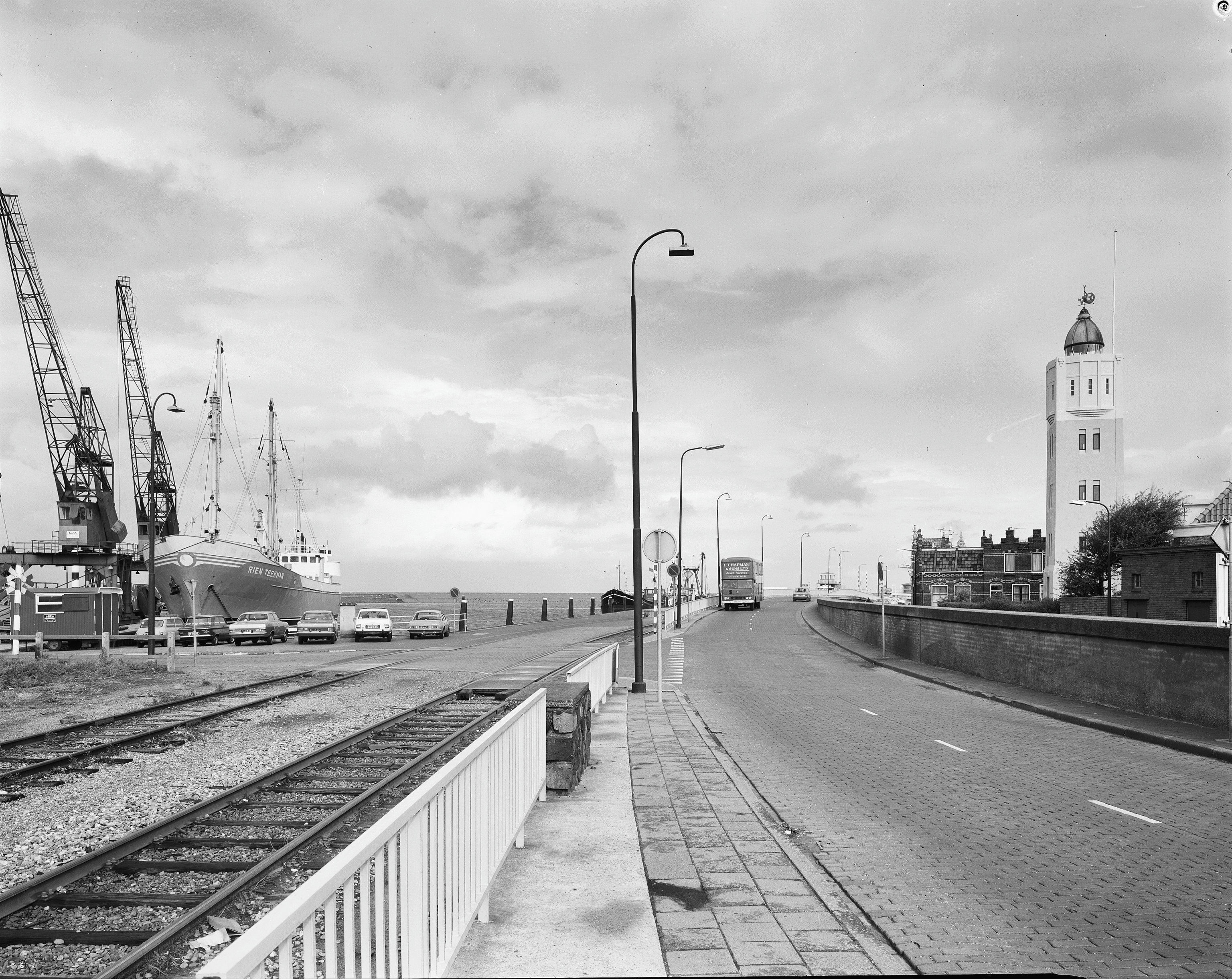
1976

== See also ==
- List of lighthouses in the Netherlands
