= Julianadorp =

- Town
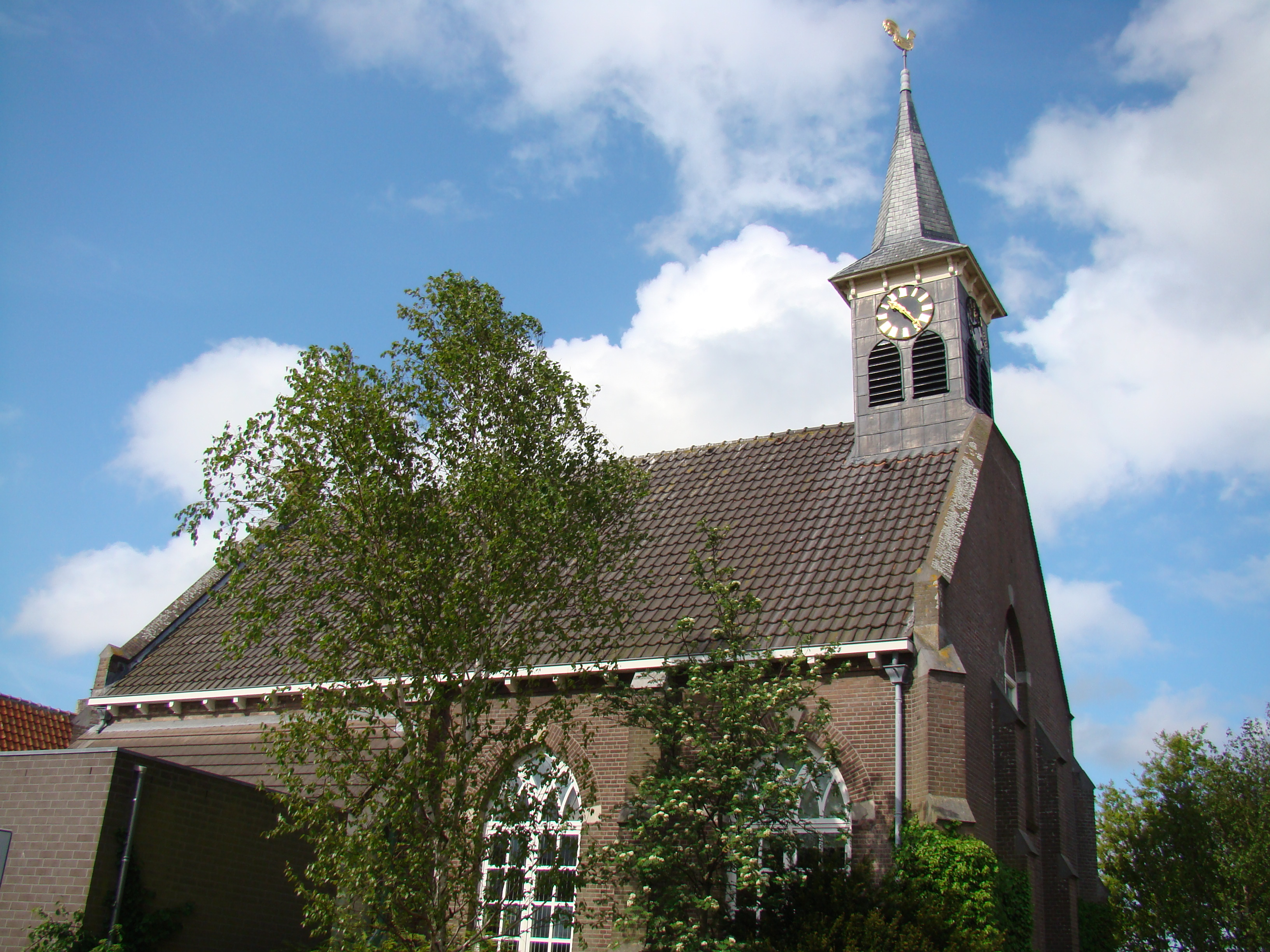
- Church of Julianadorp

- Flag

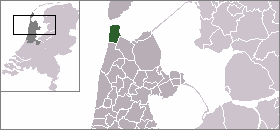

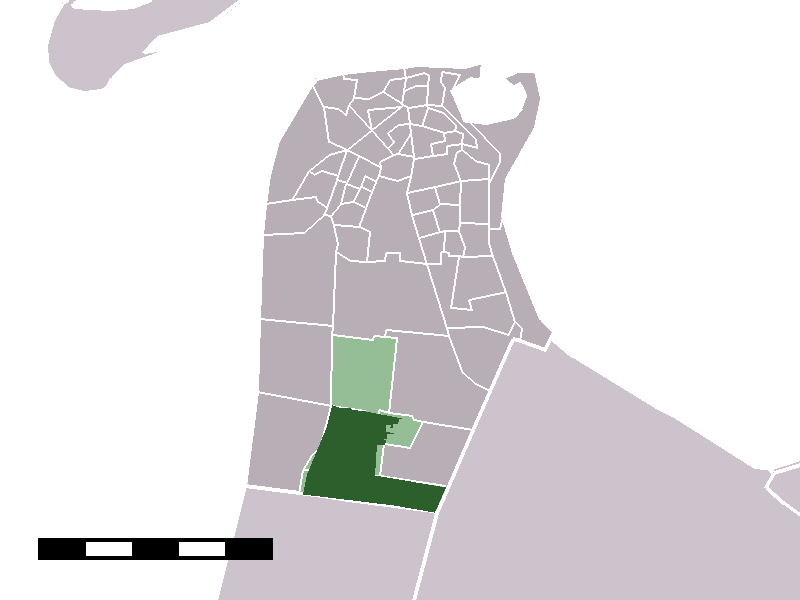
- The town centre (dark green) and the statistical district (light green) of Julianadorp in the municipality of Den Helder.
- Coordinates: 52°53′N 4°44′E
- Country: Netherlands
- Province: North Holland
- Municipality: Den Helder

Population (1 January 2006)
  - Total: 13,925
- Time zone: UTC+1 (CET)
  - Summer (DST): UTC+2 (CEST)
- Postal code: 1787–1788
- Dialing code: 0223

Julianadorp is a town in North Holland, Netherlands. It is part of the municipality of Den Helder. It lies about 6 kilometres (3.7 miles) south of the town of Den Helder, north of the municipality of Schagen and west of Hollands Kroon.

== History ==
It was formed in 1909, and named after Princess Juliana who was born that same year. Entrepreneur Pieter Loopuyt asked Queen Wilhelmina in October 1909 for permission to name the village after the newborn princess. Permission was granted. During World War II, Julianadorp changed its name to Loopuytdorp, because the Germans were not pleased with the link to the Dutch Royal family. After the war, the village got its original name back.

== Economics and recreation ==
Because of its vicinity to the beach and its many hours of sunshine (on average 1650-1700 per year), Julianadorp is a popular tourist destination. According to the town, it is also located within the world's largest contiguous tulip bulb-growing area. The western part of Julianadorp, located at the seaside, is called Julianadorp aan Zee (English: Julianadorp at Sea). There are eight holiday parks and several smaller farm campsites, minicampings and bed and breakfasts.

=== Shopping centers ===
There are three shopping centers in Julianadorp:

- Loopuytpark
- Dorperweerth
- De Riepel

=== Julianapop ===
Julianapop is a yearly music festival that is held in Julianadorp in June. The first edition was in 1993, and was organized by cultural organization Julianadorp Vooruit. After the first edition, Julianapop split ways with Julianadorp Vooruit and since 1994 it has been organized by an independent foundation. It used to be held at the IJsclub Julianadorp ice skating rink, but since 2017 Julianapop has outgrown that location and is now held in a nearby field.

== Population ==
In 2001, the town of Julianadorp had 14,359 inhabitants. The built-up area of the town was 3.12 km^{2}, and contained 5,280 residences. The statistical district "Julianadorp", which covers the village and the surrounding countryside, has a population of around 14,710.
