= KZC =

KZC or kzc may refer to:

- Kennemer Zweefvlieg Club, a Dutch Gliding club
- KZC, the IATA airport code for Kampong Chhnang Airport, Cambodia
- KZC, the Indian Railways station code for Kulukkallur railway station, Kerala, India
- kzc, the ISO 639-3 code for Bondoukou language, Ivory Coast and Ghana
