= System requirements (spacecraft system) =

System requirements in spacecraft systems are the specific system requirements needed to design and operate a spacecraft or a spacecraft subsystem.

== Overview ==
The V-Model of the general Systems Development Life Cycle.

Spacecraft systems are normally developed under the responsibility of space agencies as NASA, ESA etc. In the space area standardized terms and processes have been introduced to allow for unambiguous communication between all partners and efficient usage of all documents. For instance the life cycle of space systems is divided in phases:

- Phase A: Feasibility Study
- Phase B: Requirements Definition
- Phase C/D: Design / Manufacturing / Verification
- Phase E: Operational usage.

At the end of phase B the system requirements together with a statement of work are sent out requesting proposals from industry.

=== Technical systems requirement ===
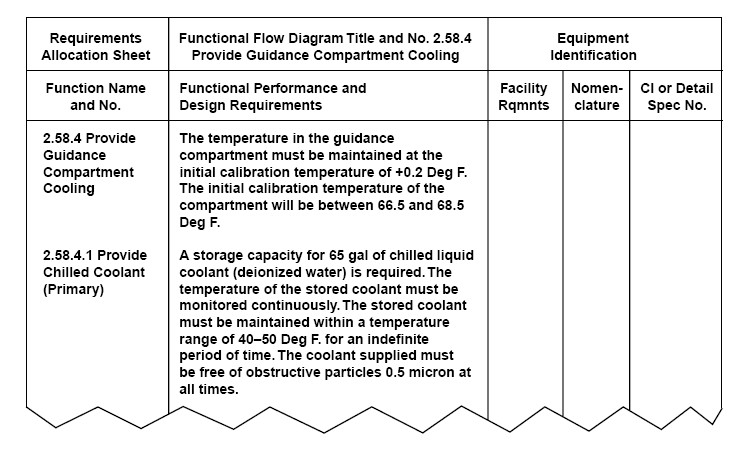
Systems requirements can be specified in a "Requirements Allocation Sheet".

Both technical and nontechnical system requirements are contained in the statement of work. The technical system requirements documented in the System Specification stay on mission level: System functions and performances, Orbit, Launch vehicle, etc. Non-technical system (task) requirements: Cost and progress reporting, Documentation maintenance, etc.

The customer (requirements) specification is answered by the contractor by a design-to specification. For example, the requirement "Columbus shall be launched by the Space Shuttle." is detailed in the contractor system specification "Columbus shall be a cylindrical pressurized module with max. length of 6.9 meters and 4.5 meters diameter as agreed in the Shuttle/Columbus ICD."

=== Operations environment ===
The spacecraft's systems specification, according to David Michael Harland (2005), usually also defines the operation environment of the spacecraft. It mostly is defined "as a model - often provide by the scientific community from available data - in the form of a set of curves, numerical tables, or software, usually with a nominal expectation and the minimal and maximum profiles which the environment is not expected to exceed".

== System specification structure ==
A typical industry generated system specification for a spacecraft has the following structure (e.g. Columbus Design Spec (COL-RIBRE-SPE-0028, iss.10/F, 06.25.2004):

- Document change record
- 1. Scope
  - 1.1 Purpose
  - 1.2 Summary description
  - 1.3 Classification
  - 1.4 Applicability
- 2. Related documents
  - 2.1 Applicable documents (incl. order of precedence)
  - 2.2 Reference documents
- 3. Functional /Performance Requirements
- 4. Support requirements
  - 4.1 Product assurance
  - 4.2 Electro-magnetic compatibility
  - 4.3 Contamination
  - 4.4 etc.
- 5. Interface requirements
  - 5.1 System interfaces
    - 5.1.1 Launcher
    - 5.1.2 Ground stations
    - 5.1.3 etc.
  - 5.2 Subsystem interfaces
    - 5.2.1 Electrical power
    - 5.2.2 Data
    - 5.2.3 etc.
- 6. Implementation requirements
  - 6.1 Configuration
  - 6.2 Budget Allocations
    - 6.2.1 Mass
    - 6.2.2 Electrical power
    - 6.2.3 etc.
- 7. Preparation for delivery
- Attachments (Abbreviation list etc.)

Each requirement paragraph consists of the requirement to be fulfilled by the product to be delivered and the verification requirement (Review of design, analysis, test, inspection).

== Specification tree ==
The spacecraft system specification defines also the subsystems of the spacecraft e.g.: Structure, Data management subsystem incl. software, Electrical Power, Mechanical, etc. For each subsystem a subsystem specification is prepared by the Prime Contractor with the same specification structure shown above including references to the parent paragraph in the system specification. In the same way the subsystem contractor prepares an assembly or unit specification. All these specifications are listed in a so-called specification tree showing all specifications and their linkage as well as the issue / date of each specification.

== Literature ==
- 2005, David Michael Harland, Ralph Lorenz, Space Systems Failures: Disasters and Rescues of Satellites, Rockets, Springer, p. 178.
- 2003, Peter W. Fortescue, Graham Swinerd, Spacecraft Systems Engineering, John Wiley and Sons, 704 pp.
- 2001, DoD - Systems Management College, Systems Engineering Fundamentals. Defense Acquisition University Press, January 2001.

== See also ==
- Requirements
- Requirements analysis
- Requirements engineering
- Requirements management
- Verification of system requirements
- Verification (spaceflight)
