= Museum of Comic Art =

Museum in Noordwijk, Netherlands

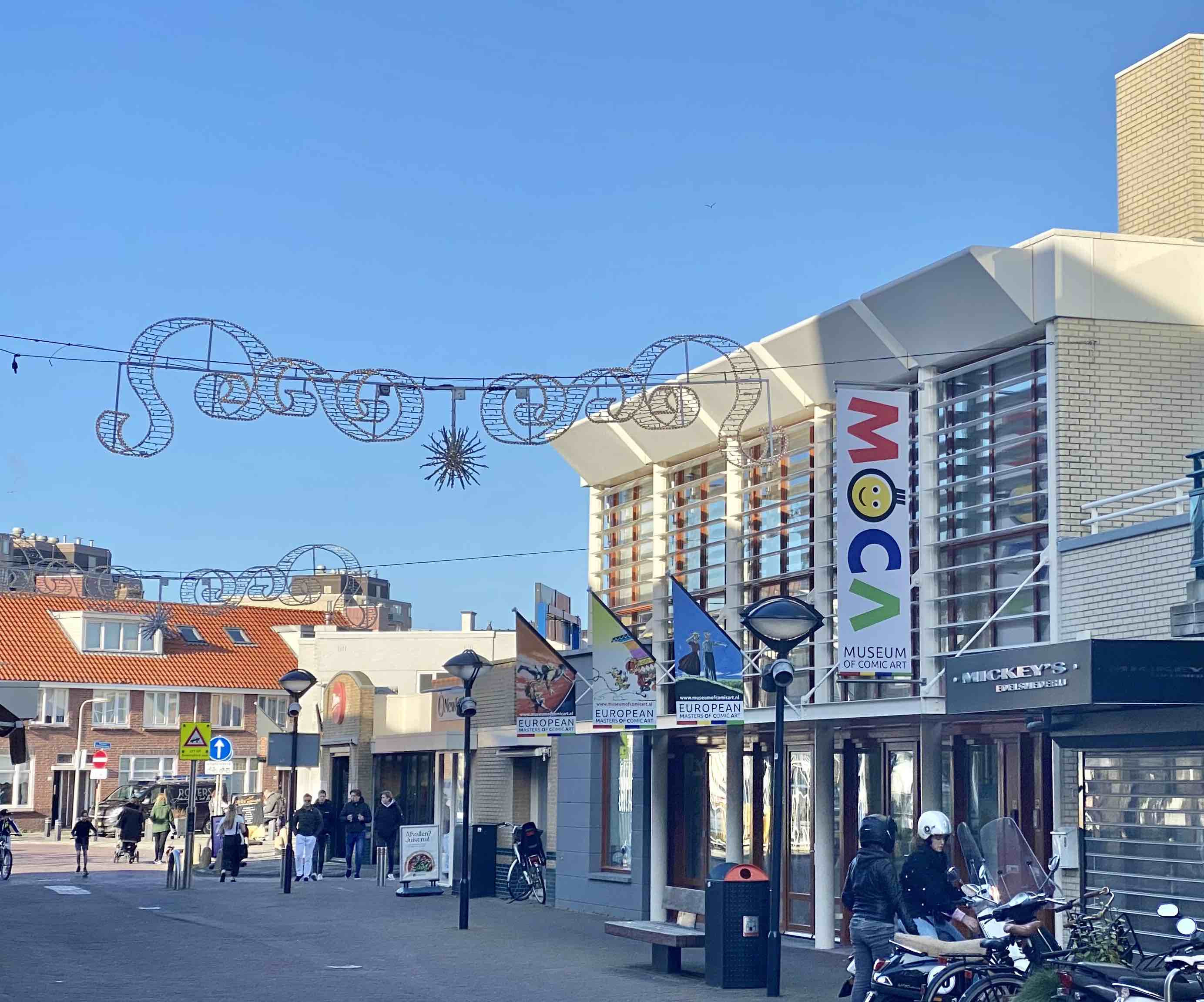
- Entrance hall of Museum of Comic Art
- Established: November 28, 2020
- Location: Noordwijk, South Holland, The Netherlands
- Coordinates: 52°14′37″N 4°25′54″E
- Type: Original comic art.
- Website: www.museumofcomicart.nl

The Museum of Comic Art (MoCA) in Noordwijk, The Netherlands, is an international art museum that specializes in original artwork by European and U.S. comic book and newspaper comic artists. Its primary focus are original comic strips and comic book pages by influential artists such as Winsor McCay, Richard Outcault, Hergé, André Franquin, Jijé, Peyo and Morris. There are new exhibitions every summer and winter.

The museum opened its first exhibition, European Masters of Comic Art for Friends of MoCA on November 28, 2020. After the second COVID-19 lockdown around that time, the museum eventually opened its doors to the general public on 9 June 2021. The opening day received a lot of positive attention in the Dutch press. while the renovation was reviewed in De Architect.

== History ==
After the failure of the Strips! museum in Rotterdam and the absorption of the Nederlands Stripmuseum in Groningen to the more contemporary multimedia museum Storyworld, comics historians Ger Apeldoorn and John Asselbergs decided to try and establish a new comics museum near the coast. John Asselbergs had previously organized and curated the Strips in Space exhibition in the Space Expo museum in Noordwijk. They were soon joined by Arie Korbee, an architect who previously designed the cultural centre De Muze in Noordwijk and the Modern Art Museum in Lisse, LAM. He is also a long-standing collector of comic art and has an extensive collection with representative work of all the great Dutch, European and American masters and had a longtime wish to do create a museum from his collection. He offered to buy a doublefronted store in one of Noordwijks busiest shopping areas, which he had designed himself years ago. Korbee redesigned it and used his collection as the basis for a small but high grade museum. MoCA was organised in a foundation on April 16, 2020, to safeguard the financial situation.

== Exhibitions ==
The MoCA only exhibits original comic art, with added information providing the background and a new mural by Dutch comic master Dick Matena. The museum itself holds only a small amount of pieces, which is why a new exhibition is planned twice a year. After European Masters of Comic, exhibitions were made about 21 innovators of Dutch comics history, 70 years of production for the Dutch Walt Disney magazine Donald Duck and the work and talent from the influential Dutch Toonder Studios. There have also been presentations of new comic books and books about the history of the genre.
