= Leonard van Utrecht =

Dutch footballer

Personal information
- Date of birth: 25 February 1969 (age 57)
- Place of birth: Noordwijk, Netherlands
- Position: Forward

Youth career
- 1989–1992: Noordwijk

Senior career*
| Years | Team | Apps | (Gls) |
| 1992–1994 | Excelsior | 63 | (12) |
| 1994–1995 | Cambuur | 43 | (7) |
| 1995–1997 | Padova | 28 | (2) |
| 1997–2001 | Cambuur | 130 | (11) |
| 2001–2002 | ADO Den Haag | 22 | (2) |
| 2002–2003 | Noordwijk | 16 | (1) |
- * Club domestic league appearances and goals

Leendert van Utrecht (born 25 February 1969) is a Dutch retired footballer who played as a forward for Noordwijk, SBV Excelsior, SC Cambuur, Padova and ADO Den Haag.
