= Eurospace =

Association of European companies involved in space activities

Eurospace is a non-profit organisation created in 1961 and incorporated under French law.

== Information ==
Eurospace was established in the year of 1961. Eurospace is an association of 55 European companies involved in space activities. It maintains permanent liaison with the European Space Agency and other individual government organizations that promote space activities in Europe. Eurospace works to gain information and seek further possibilities that do with space in order to receive a greater understanding of space along with staying on good terms with other associations involved with the same cause. In the year of 2004, Eurospace had transformed into the Space Group of ASD that is the AeroSpace and Defence Industries Association of Europe, which was formerly known as the AECMA. This group revolved around the idea of space interests and activities. Eurospace has the overall goal of focusing on space policy and strategy in order to promote a more space conscious Europe.

== See also ==
- French space program
- European Union
- France
