= Verification (spaceflight) =

Verification in the field of space systems engineering covers two verification processes: Qualification and Acceptance

== Overview ==
In the field of spaceflight, verification standards are developed by DoD, NASA and the ECSS, among others. Large aerospace corporations may also develop their own internal standards. These standards exist in order to specify requirements for the verification of a space system product, such as:

- the fundamental concepts of the verification process
- the criteria for defining the verification strategy and
- the rules, organization, and process for the implementation of the verification program

Verification or qualification, is one main reason that costs for space systems are high. All data are to be documented and to stay accessible for potential, later failure analyses. In previous times that approach was executed down to piece-parts level (resistors, switches etc.) whereas nowadays it is tried to reduce cost by usage of "CAM (Commercial, Avionics, Military) equipment" for non-safety relevant units.

== Qualification and Acceptance ==
Qualification is the formal proof that the design meets all requirements of the specification and the parameters agreed in the Interface Control Documents (ICD) requirements with adequate margin, including tolerances due to manufacturing imperfections, wear-out within specified life-time, faults, etc. The end of the qualification process is the approval signature of the customer on the Certificate of Qualification (CoQ), or Qualification Description Document (QDD) agreeing that all the requirements are met by the product to be delivered under the terms of a contract.

Acceptance is the formal proof that the product identified is free of workmanship defects and meets preset performance requirements with adequate margin. Acceptance is based on the preceding qualification by reference to the used design / manufacturing documentation. The end of the acceptance process is the approval signature of the customer on the CoA, or QDD, agreeing that all the requirements are met by the product to be delivered under the terms of a contract.

There are five generally accepted Qualification methods:

- Analysis
- Test
- Inspection
- Demonstration
- Similarity (although Similarity is a form of Analysis, in most space applications, it is recommended to highlight it as its own category)

Being qualified means demonstrating with margin that the design, and the implementation of the design, meets the intended preset requirements. There are many different Qualification strategies in order to reach the same goals. It consists of designing hardware (or software) to qualification requirements (including margin), testing dedicated hardware (or software) to qualification requirements to verify the design, followed by acceptance testing of flight hardware to screen workmanship defects. There are other strategies as well, the Proto-Qualification strategy for instance. Proto-Qualification consists of testing the first flight hardware to Proto-Qualification requirements to verify design, and testing subsequent flight hardware to acceptance levels to screen workmanship defects. This first Proto-Qualification unit is flight-worthy.

There are three generally accepted Acceptance methods:

- Test
- Inspection
- Demonstration

If a deviation against the qualified item is detected (higher tolerances, scratches etc.) a Non-Conformance is to be processed; to justify that this item can be used despite this deviation an Analysis might be required.

== See also ==
- Spacecraft
- System engineering
