= Noordwijk =

- Municipality
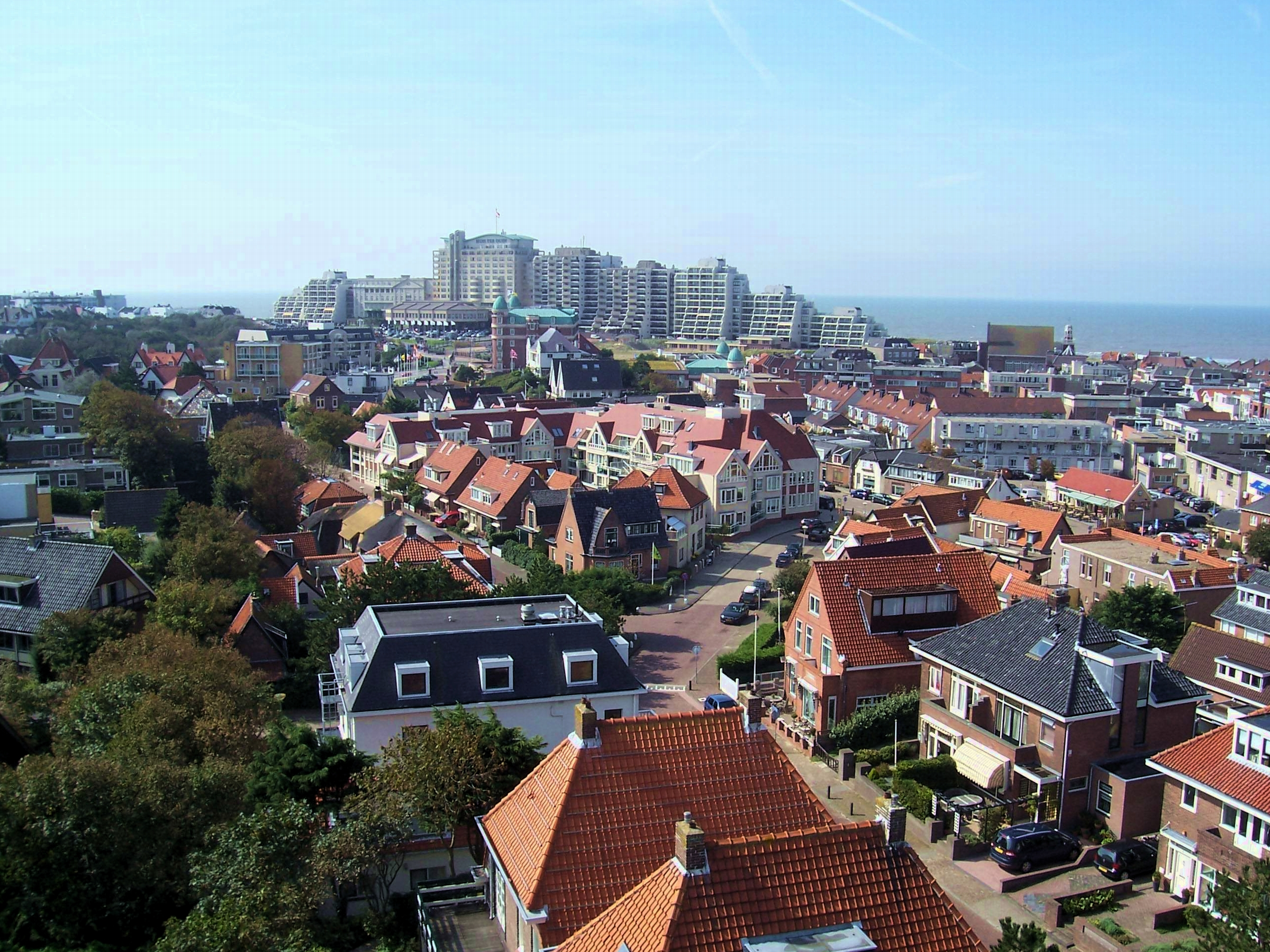
- Aerial view over Noordwijk aan Zee

- Flag Coat of arms

- Location in South Holland
- Coordinates: 52°14′N 4°27′E
- Country: Netherlands
- Province: South Holland

Government
  - Body: Municipal council
  - Mayor: Wendy Verkleij-Eimers (VVD)

Area
  - Total: 74.94 km^{2} (28.93 sq mi)
  - Land: 58.37 km^{2} (22.54 sq mi)
  - Water: 16.57 km^{2} (6.40 sq mi)
- Elevation: 3 m (9.8 ft)

Population (January 2021)
  - Total: 44,062
  - Density: 755/km^{2} (1,960/sq mi)
- Demonym: Noordwijker
- Time zone: UTC+1 (CET)
  - Summer (DST): UTC+2 (CEST)
- Postcode: 2200–2204
- Area code: 071
- Website: www.noordwijk.nl
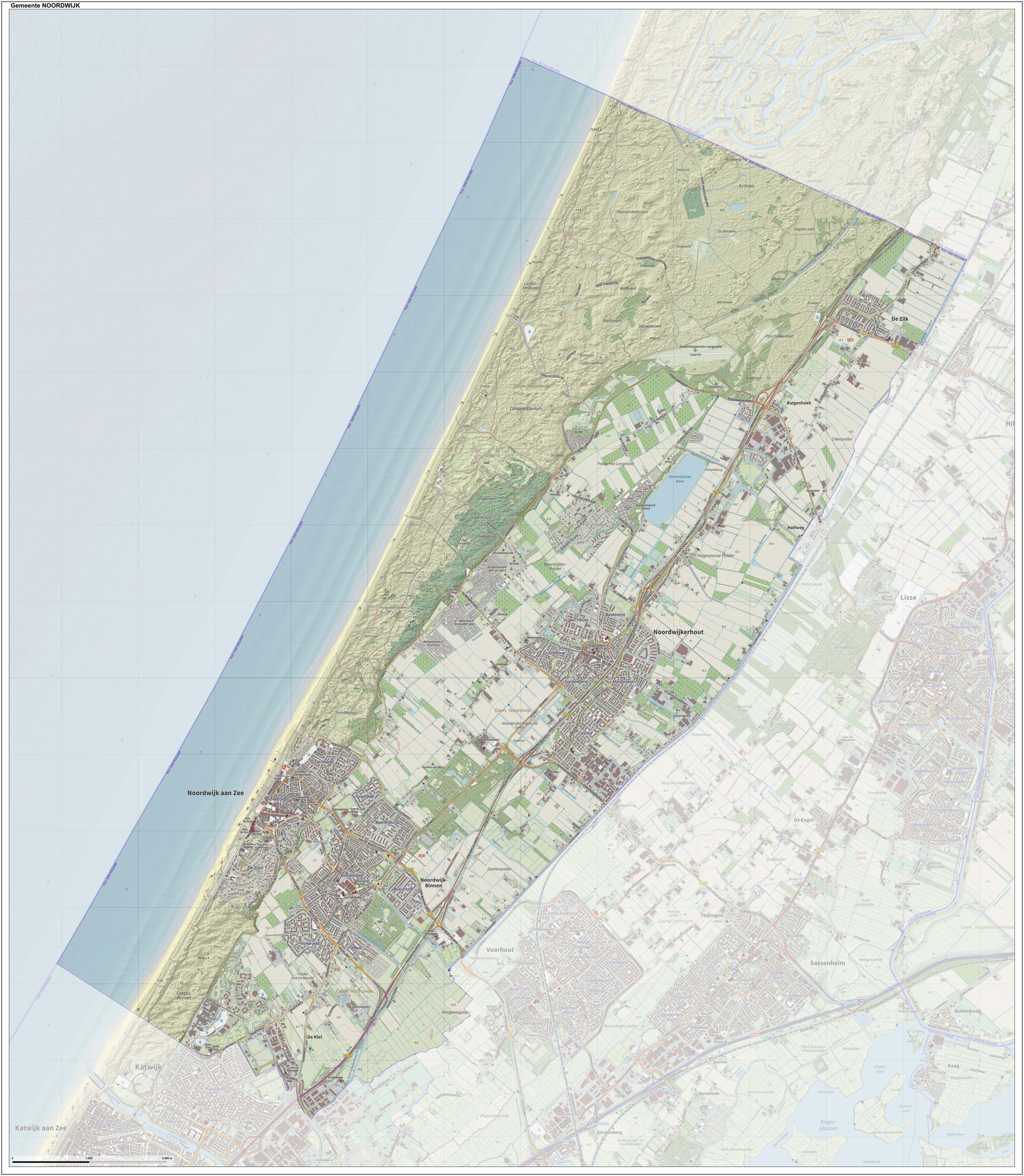
- Topographic map of Noordwijk, June 2015

Noordwijk (pronounced [ˈnoːrtʋɛik]) is a town and municipality in the west of the Netherlands, in the province of South Holland. The municipality covers an area of 74.94 km^{2} (28.93 sq mi) of which 16.57 km^{2} (6.40 sq mi) is water and had a population of 44,062 in 2021.

On 1 January 2019, the former municipality of Noordwijkerhout became part of Noordwijk.

Besides its beaches, Noordwijk is also known for its bulb flower fields. It is located in an area called the "Dune and Bulb Region" (Duin- en Bollenstreek).

Noordwijk is also the location of the headquarters for the European Space Research and Technology Centre (ESTEC), part of the European Space Agency (ESA). ESA's visitors' centre Space Expo is a permanent space exhibition.

== Communities ==
The municipality of Noordwijk consists of the communities Noordwijk aan Zee and Noordwijk-Binnen, separated by a narrow green belt, as well as Noordwijkerhout and De Zilk.

=== Noordwijk aan Zee ===
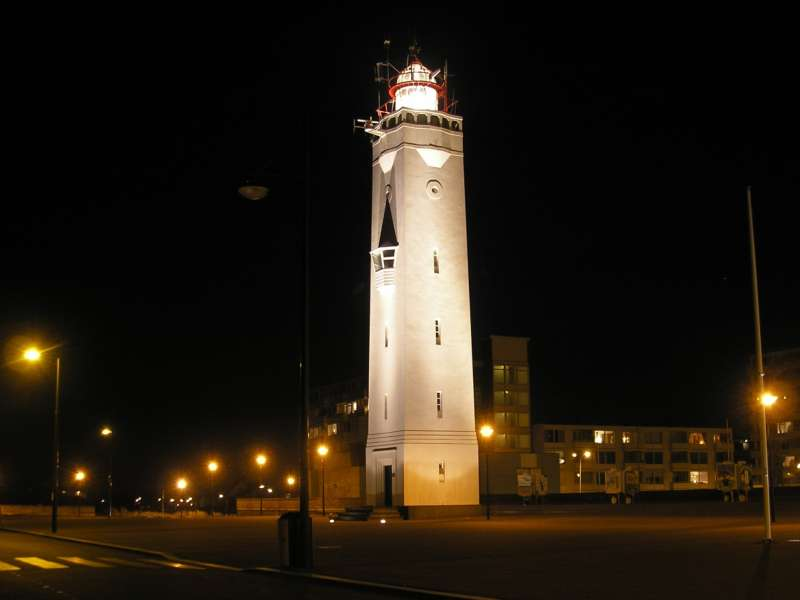
The Noordwijk Lighthouse landmark

Noordwijk aan Zee was founded around 1200 as a fishing village. Until the beginning of the 19th century, fishing remained its primary business, but then began to be replaced by the growing tourism industry. Nowadays because of its long sandy beaches, it is a popular resort town with 1,000,000 overnight stays per year. It has a lighthouse and a KNRM rescue station. Furthermore, it has a reformed church (1647) with a pulpit from the 17th century.

Noordwijk aan Zee is rated as the 12th richest location in the Netherlands.

The Grand Hotel Huis ter Duin is a notable feature of the beach front. It was established in 1885 at the beginning of the town's development as a tourist resort. It was rebuilt in 1920. During World War II it was used by the officers of the occupying SS. In 1990, during the storm of 25 January, it was largely destroyed by fire and subsequently rebuilt and greatly extended. Its clientele has included the Dutch and Belgian royal families, the writer Thomas Mann and President Barack Obama. The hotel includes a conference centre and the Michelin-starred Restaurant Latour.

A small part of the indigenous population of Noordwijk aan Zee speaks Noordwijks, a very original Dutch dialect, which sounds like Katwijks, but in Noordwijk the dialect is almost gone, compared to Katwijk, where more people speak in (partly) dialect.

=== Noordwijk-Binnen ===
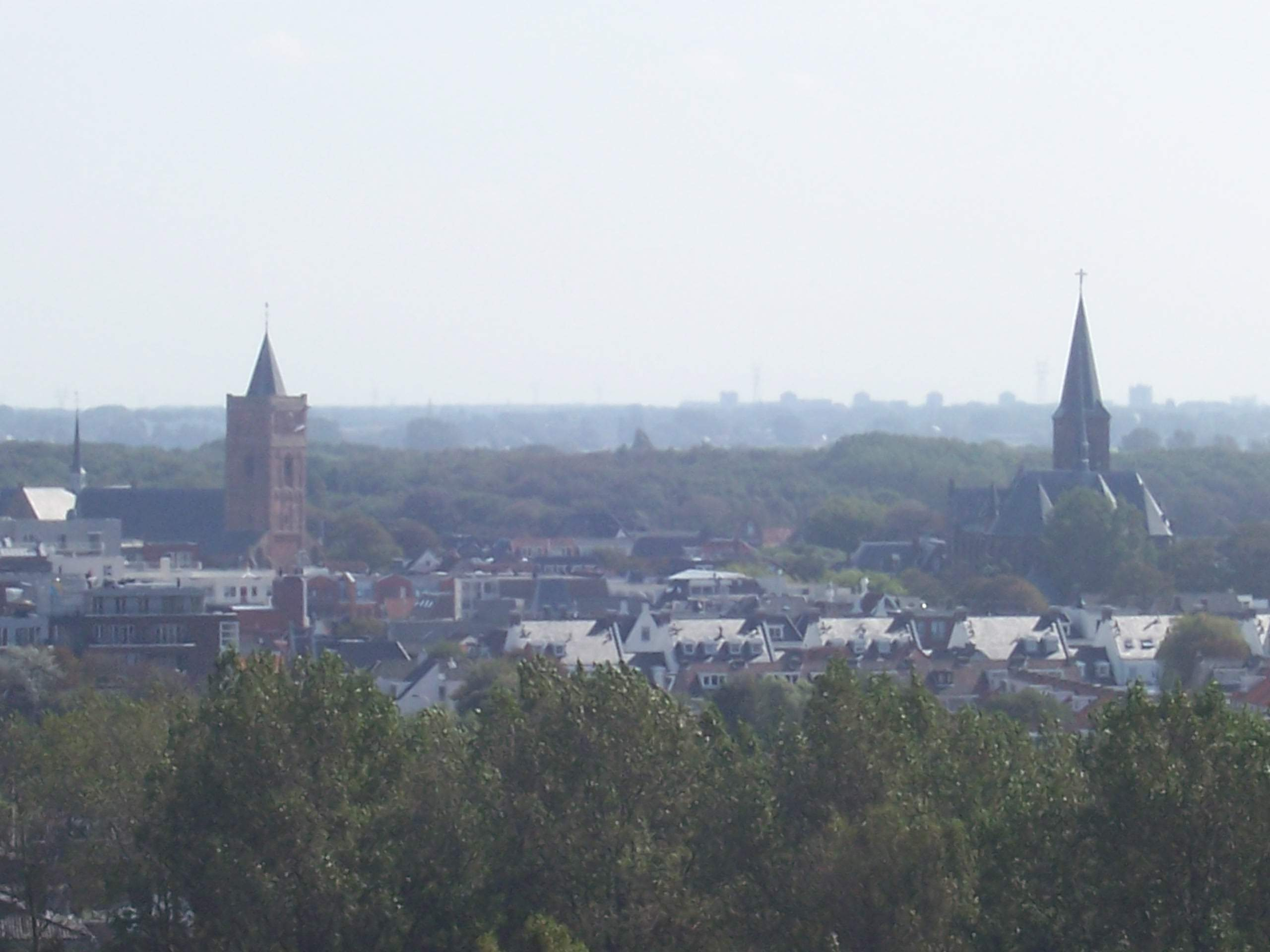
View over Noordwijk-Binnen, with two church towers.

Because of the martyrdom of Priest Jeroen in 857, the Archbishop of Utrecht made Noordwijk-Binnen a pilgrimage location in 1429. Both the Catholic and Protestant churches here are named after this priest.

Noordwijk-Binnen has retained its historic character and is therefore protected by the Dutch Monument Law. An interesting historic view is shown by the picture of Gerard van der Laan with the view to the Jeroenskerk. In the foreground is a canal with two sailboats for inland waterways.

The area around Noordwijk-Binnen has long been an important part of the regional bulb flower industry. The dunes were dug out and transformed into fields for the cultivation of bulb flowers. The territory of Noordwijk still consists mostly of geest. The bulb region is formed of Noordwijk together with surrounding municipalities.

== Nature ==
North (and to a lesser extent south) of Noordwijk spreads a relatively vast dune area, in which a varied wild flora and fauna (with among others pine forests and deer) is observable for bikers, walkers and gallopers. North of Noordwijk, large areas of dunes are covered by the natura 2000 act. Part of which holds house to the Kennemer Zweefvlieg Club.

== Personalities and public figures in Noordwijk ==
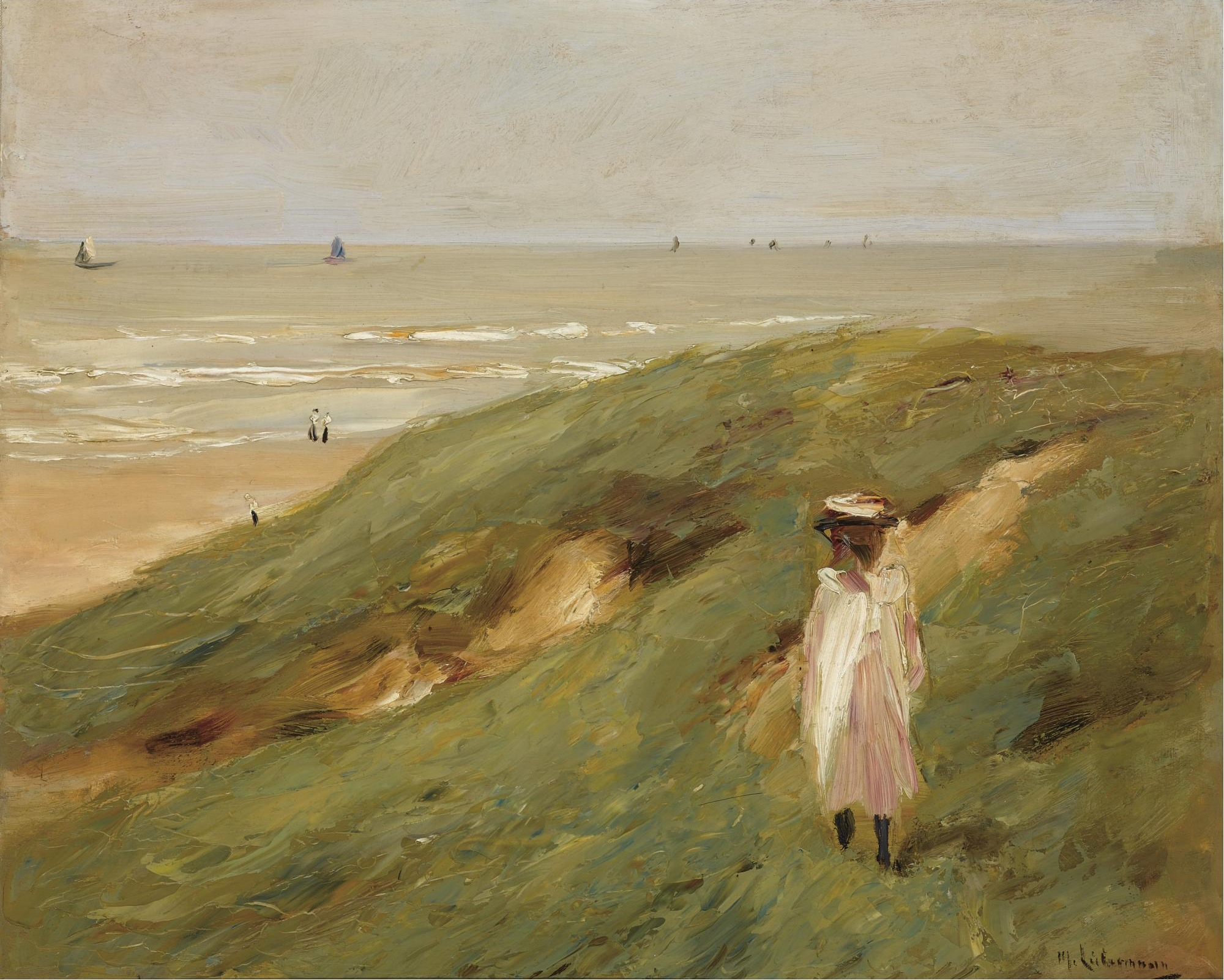
Max Liebermann (1906): Dune near Noordwijk with child.

Public figures who lived in Noordwijk or sought recovery were Thomas Mann, Maria Montessori (buried in Noordwijk) among others, the entrepreneur Alfred Heineken, ex-Empress Soraya, the poet Henriette Roland Holst, the psychoanalyst Sigmund Freud, the writer Stefan George, the pianist Pia Beck, the tenor Jacques Urlus, the writer Margriet de Moor as well as painters and artists such as Marinus Gidding, Gerard van der Laan, Max Liebermann, Daniël Noteboom, Jan Hillebrand Wijsmuller and known film actors.

The landscape painter Ludolph Berkemeier (buried in Noordwijk) moved in 1896 to Noordwijk. His paintings are in the style of the Hague School.

Noordwijk is also home of football coach Louis van Gaal.

In March 2014, the US President Barack Obama and General Secretary of the Chinese Communist Party Xi Jinping stayed in Noordwijk

Part of Martin Ritt's adaptation of John le Carre's The Spy Who Came in from the Cold (1965), starring Richard Burton, was filmed at Koningin Astrid Boulevard in Noordwijk. This is where Burton's character Alec Leamas is taken for initial interrogation after appearing to defect to the East.

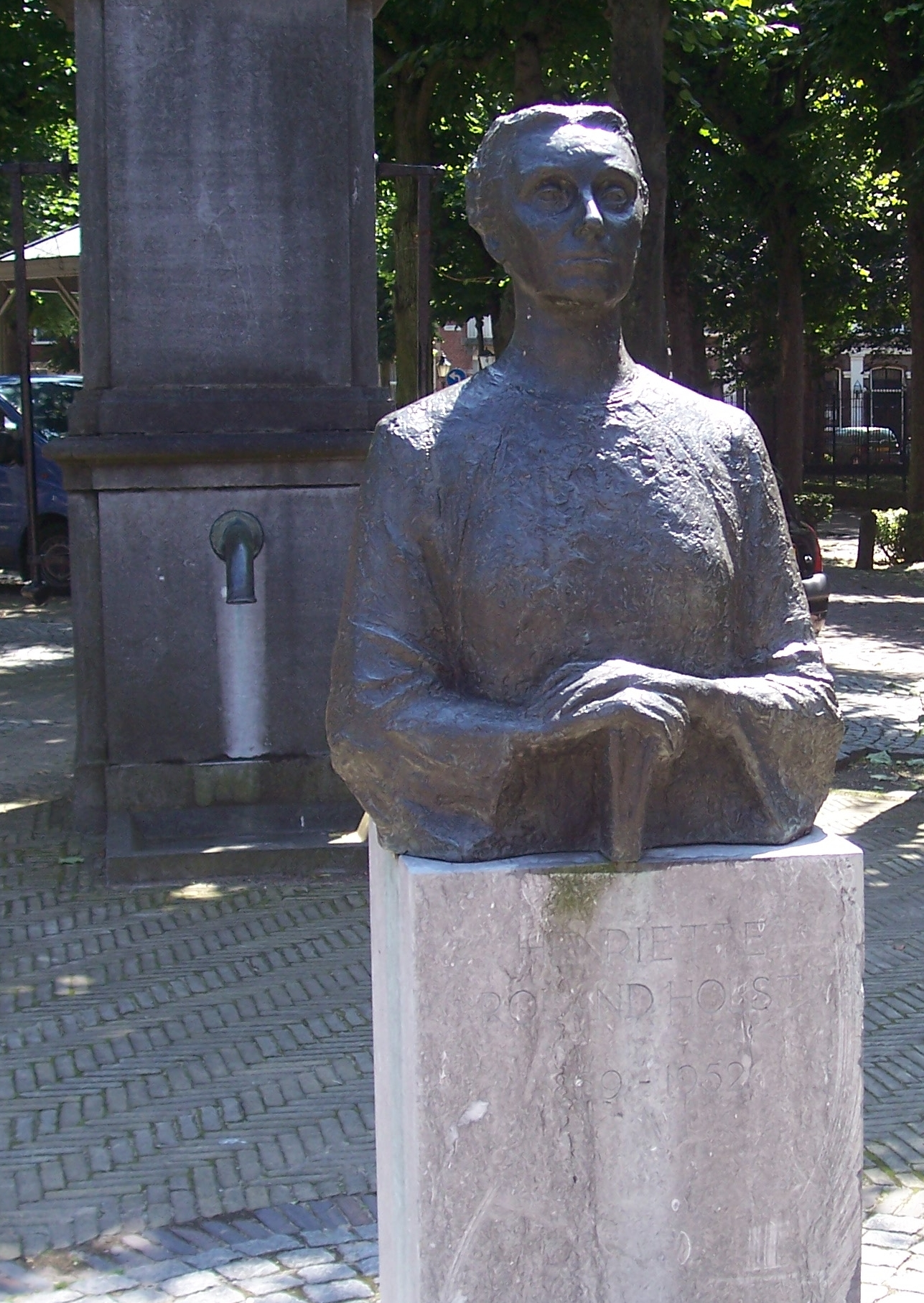
Henriëtte Roland Holst, Lindenplein, Noordwijk, 2011

=== Notable people ===
- Janus Dousa (1545–1604) Lord of Noordwyck, a Dutch statesman, jurist, historian, poet and philologist
- Petrus Jacobus Runckel (1822 in Noordwijk-Binnen – 1860) a Dutch colonial government official in the Dutch Gold Coast
- Henriette Roland Holst (1869–1952) a Dutch poet and council communist, Nobel Prize in Literature nominee
- Freddy Heineken (1923 – 2002 in Noordwijk) a Dutch businessman for Heineken International
- Lodewijk Woltjer (1930–2019) an astronomer
- Margriet de Moor (born 1941) a Dutch pianist and writer of novels and essays
- Leendert van Utrecht (born 1969) a retired Dutch footballer with 300 club caps
- Joris Putman (born 1984) a Dutch actor
- Janieck Devy (born 1994) a Dutch singer-songwriter, musician and actor
- Jan Driessen (born 1996) a Dutch basketball player. 3x3 Gold medal Paris Olympics 2024

== World War II bunker complex ==
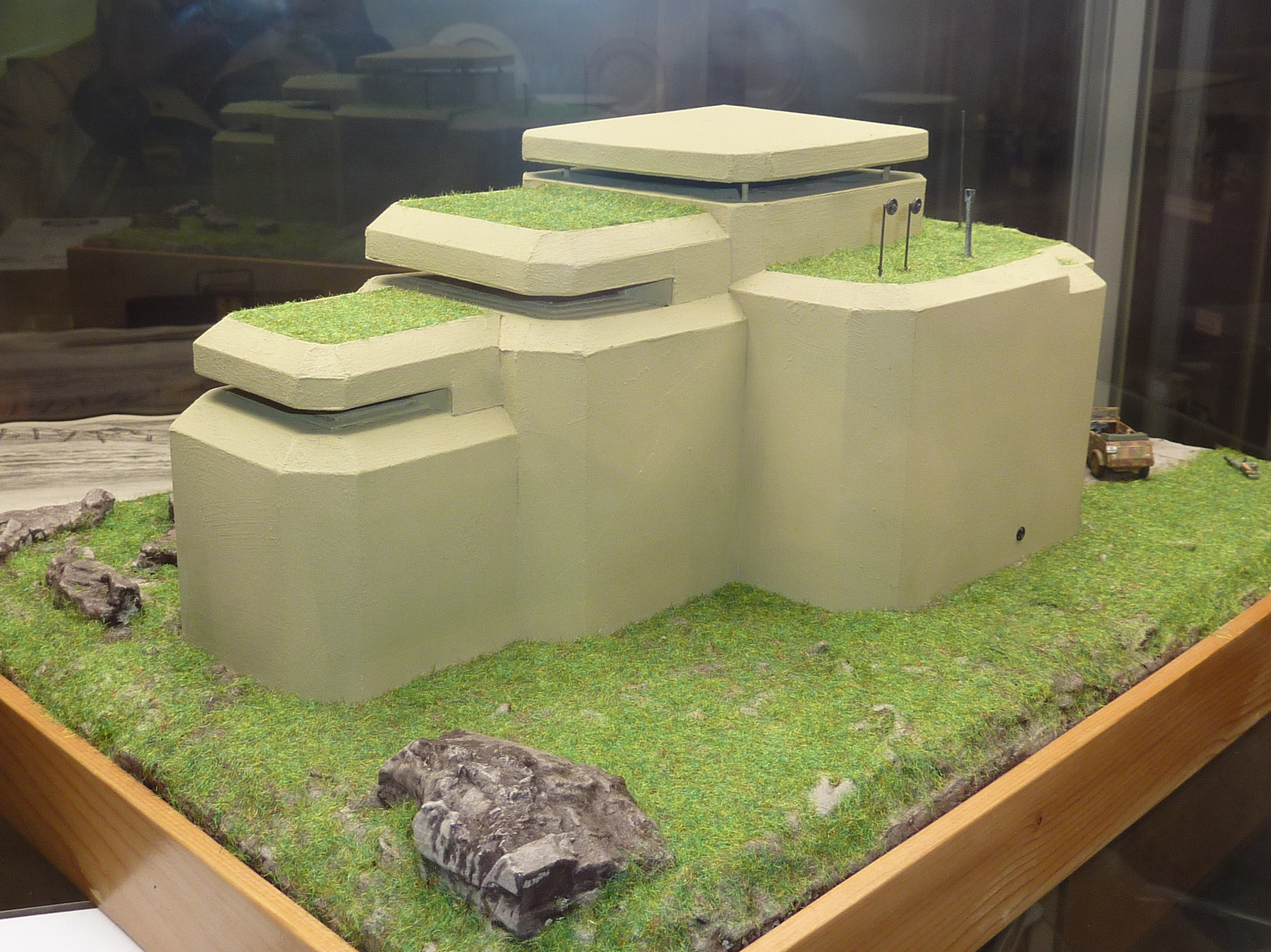
Scale model of main fire command bunker in museum

Just north of Noordwijk, buried in the North Sea dunes, lies one of the biggest and most extensive bunker complexes in the Netherlands of the World War II Atlantic Wall defenses, constructed under Nazi Germany occupation. Some 80 bunkers and underground structures housed 180 soldiers, and were connected by 400 metres (a quarter-mile) of tunnels, equipped with narrow rail-tracks for moving heavy ammunition. The central, S414 design, fire command bunker alone counts three-man-high stories deep, and with walls up to 3 metres (10 feet) thick, it consists of more than 1,800 m^{3} of concrete – the equivalent content of some 300 modern cement trucks. Four heavy gun bunkers housed 155mm cannons and doubled as living quarters. Two other large bunkers stored ammunition.

The fire control bunker offered an excellent view of the coastal sea, used for observation and ballistic trajectory calculation, to control the entire gun battery. In 2001, the central command bunker was reopened as a museum, refitted with mostly original equipment. Because the Germans kept the men busy building further bunkers, pill-boxes, etc., by war's end the complex counted almost one underground structure for every two men.

== Museum of Comic Art, Noordwijk ==
- Since 2021 Noordwijk has its own comics museum, the MoCA, or Museum of Comic Art, Noordwijk.

== See also ==
- Noordwijk Conference of 6 September 1955

== Gallery ==
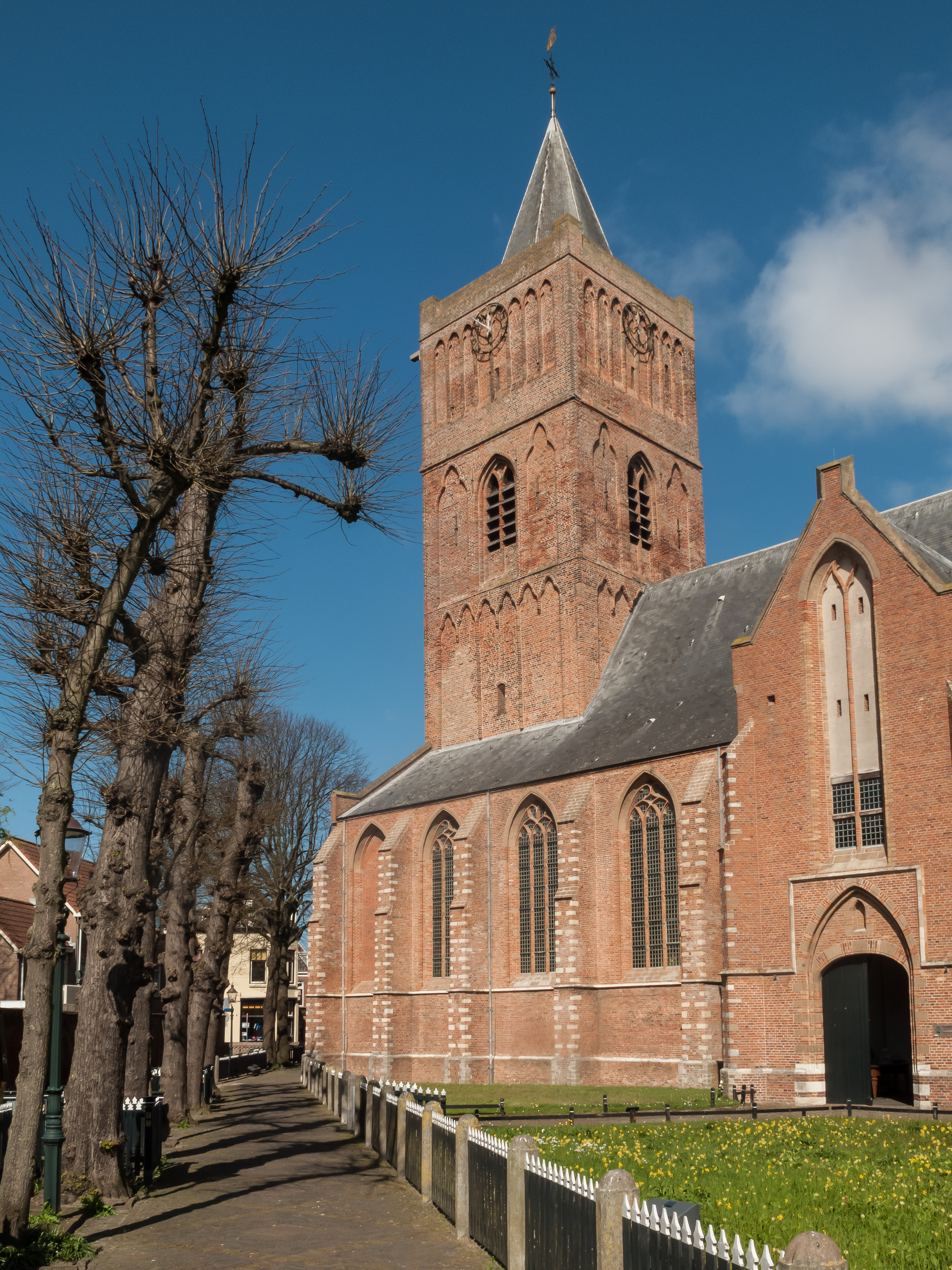
Church: de Oude Jeroenskerk

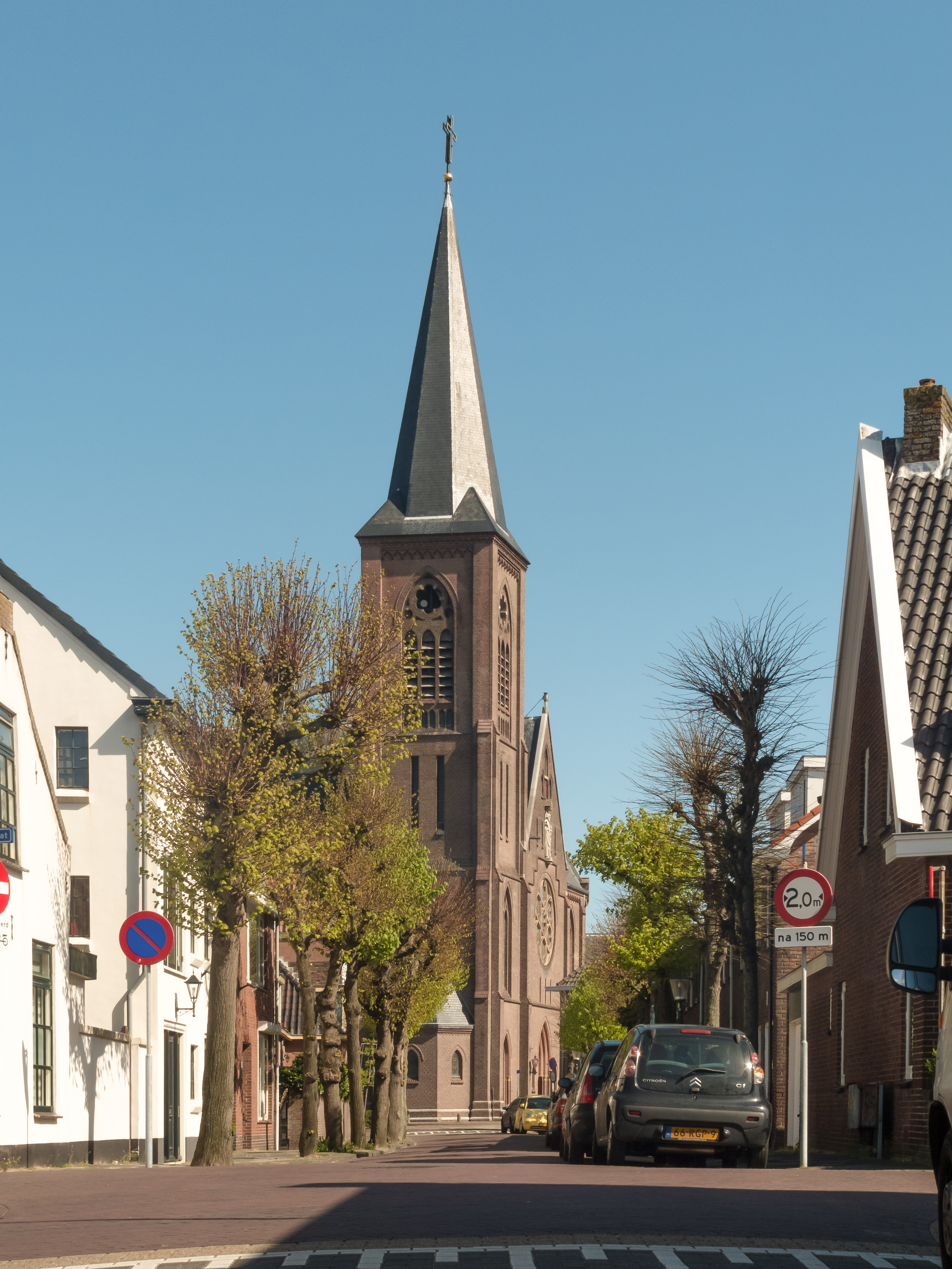
Church: de Sint Jeroenskerk

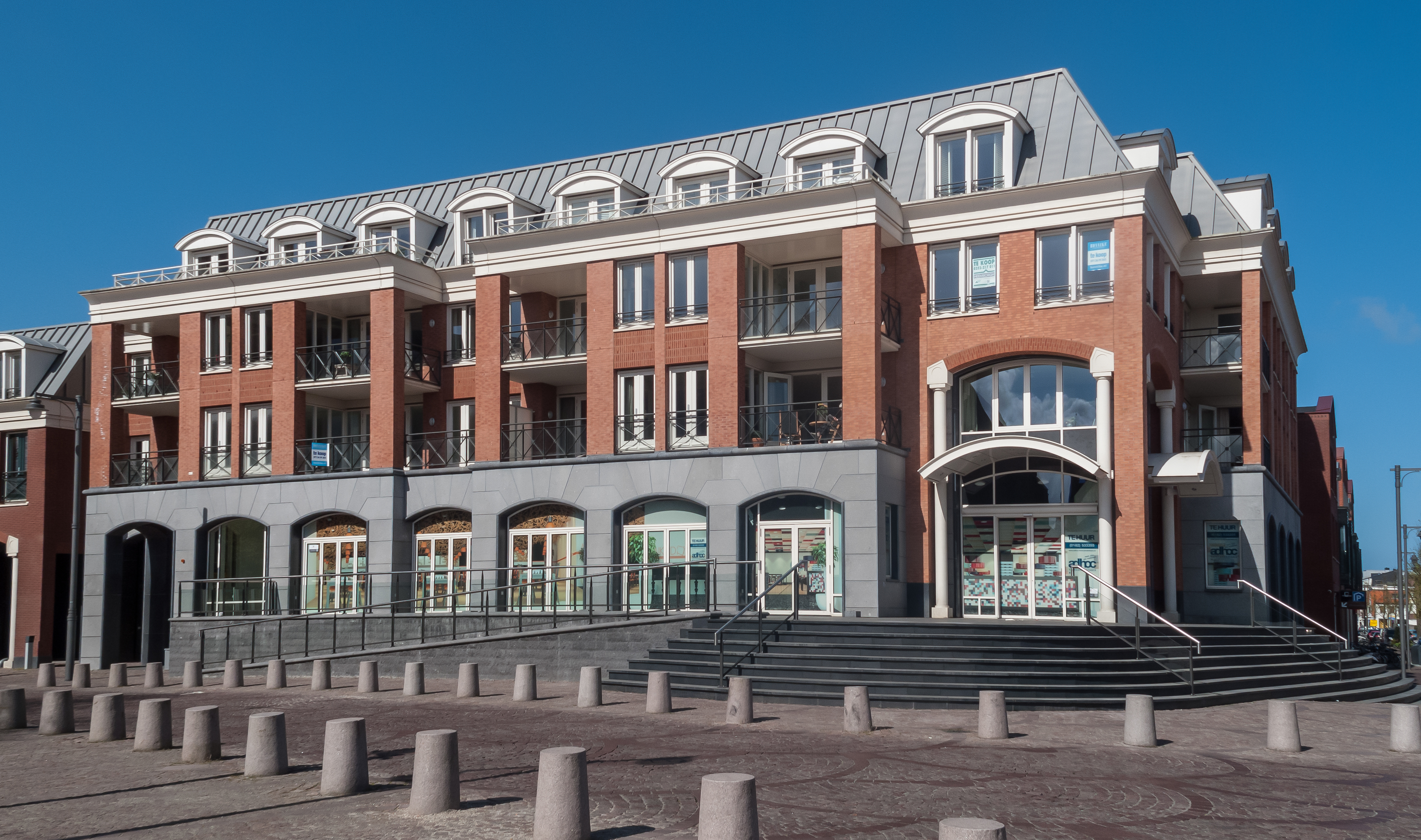
View to a street: Heilige Geestweg-Raadhuisstraat

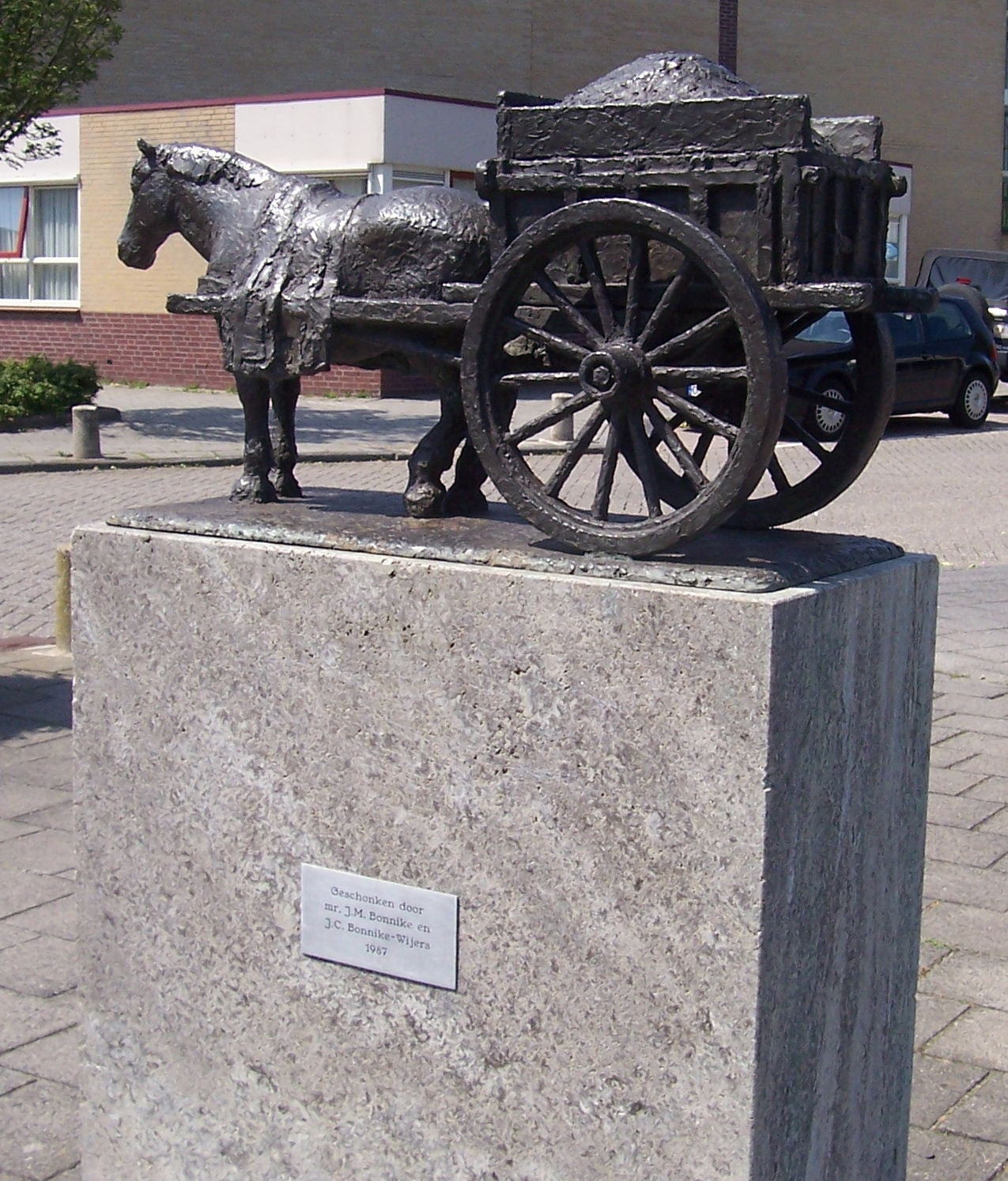
One of the many sculptures in Noordwijk.

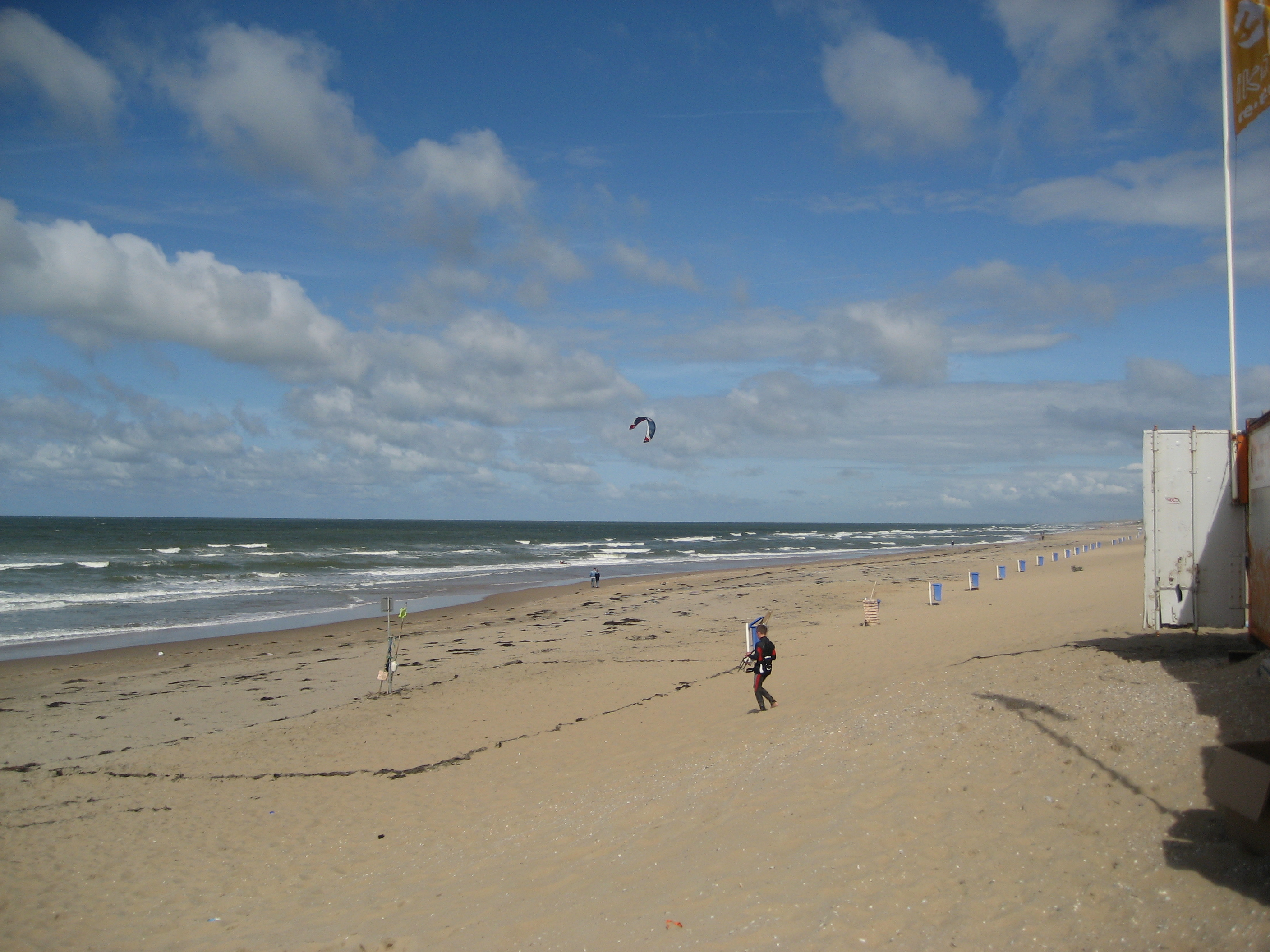
Noordwijk beach on a non-summers day, when kitesurfers have all the room there

== Bibliography ==
- Noordwijk: Webster's Timeline History, 1398–2007, by Icon Group International, 2010, ASIN B0062YIAYR.
- E.W. Petrejus: De Bomschuit, een verdwenen scheepstype, 1954, Museum voor Land- en Volkerkunde enhet Maritiern Museum "Prins Hendrik", Nr. 2.
- Norma Broude (1990): World Impressionism: The International Movement — 1860–1920, Harry N. Abrams, inc. ISBN 9780810917743.
- Ronald de Leeuw, John Sillevis, Charles Dumas (1983): The Hague School, Dutch Masters of the 19th Century. — Exhibition-Catalogue, Weidenfeld and Nicolson, London, ISBN 9780297780694.
- Terry van Druten, Maite van Dijk, John Silveris: De aquarel – Nederlandse meesters van de negentiende eeuw. THOT, Teylers Museum und De Mesdag Collectie, Bussum 2015, ISBN 978-90-6868-673-9.
- Willem Bastian Tholen: Hollandsche Teekenmaatschappij. Den Haag 1914.
