= Kennemer Zweefvlieg Club =

Langeveld
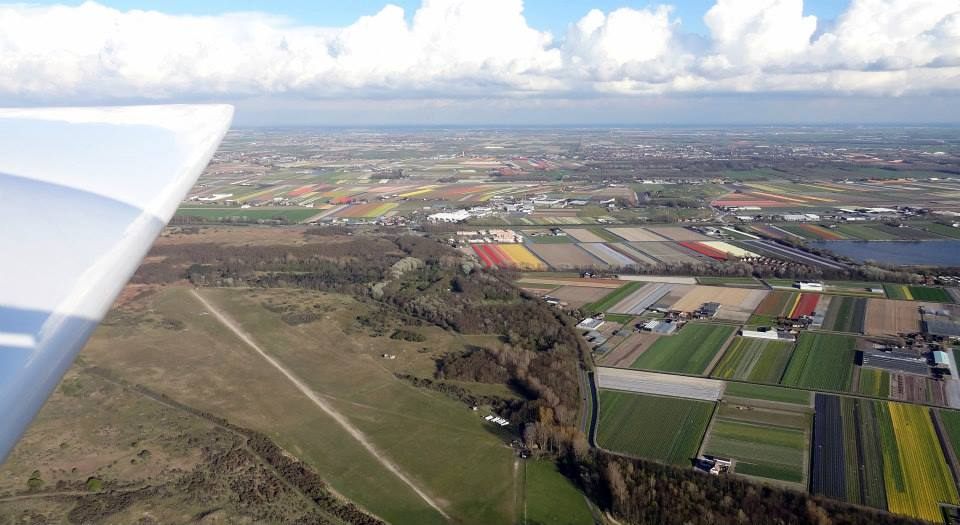
- IATA: -; ICAO: -

Summary
- Airport type: Private
- Location: Noordwijk
- Opened: 1945
- Time zone: CET (+1)
- Elevation AMSL: 16 ft / 5 m
- Coordinates: 52°17′46″N 4°30′24″E
- Website: www.kzc.nl

Map
- Location in the Netherlands

Runways
Direction	Length		Surface
Direction	ft	m	Surface
09-27		950 m	Grass
04-22		600 m	Grass

Statistics (2016)
- movements: ▲8000
- flighthours: ▲860
- members: ▲90

The Kennemer Zweefvlieg Club (KZC) is a Dutch Gliding club, and the only such club based in an urban periphery (what in Dutch is called a "Randstad"). The club was founded in 1945. The airfield from which it operates is Langeveld, situated amongst the dunes of the Dutch west coast between Zandvoort and Noordwijk. The club flies on Wednesdays, Saturdays and Sundays from March till November. Wednesday evening flights give passengers the chance to fly in a two-seater glider. The club is equipped with a former RAF MEL-winch with six cables.

== Dune running ==
The KZC is one of the few clubs in the Netherlands that is able to benefit from what is called Ridgelift. When the wind blows from the northwest, it is deflected upwards by the local dunes: if the speed of the wind is great enough, the uplift provided by the air rising from the dunes is strong enough to match a glider's weight, and it is possible to fly parallel to the dunes without descending. Gliders then land on the beach for derigging and transport back to Langeveld by trailer. (The airfield is too far from the dunes for gliding back there ro be possible.)

== The fleet ==
The KZC owns gliders of several different kinds, enabling it to accommodate the needs of variety of members, whether they wish to train as pilots, participate in competitions, fly with passengers or fly cross country. Included in its fleet are:

- Schleicher ASK 21, a twin seater that is excellent for both training flights and passenger flights.
- Schleicher ASK 21B, a twin seater that is excellent for both training flights and passenger flights. It has some better flight characteristics then the original ASK 21.
- Schleicher ASK 23, a single seater that, because of its easy flight characteristics, is perfect for student pilots.
- Schleicher ASW 27B, a single seater that looks similar to the ASW 28, but has flaps.
- Rolladen-Schneider LS4, a single seater with great performance and with good flight characteristics, is perfect for both training and cross country flights.

Furthermore, the club possesses two self-built oldtimer gliders. They were assembled in the 1960s in the Fokker factory:

- Schleicher K 8, a single seater with easy flight characteristics that is used by apprentices to practice.
- Schleicher K 6, a singleseater with an eye-catching green fuselage. This glider received the 'most beautiful K6' award in 2014 by the Dutch association for historic gliders.
