= 1948 Sabena Douglas C-47 crash =

Aviation incident in Africa

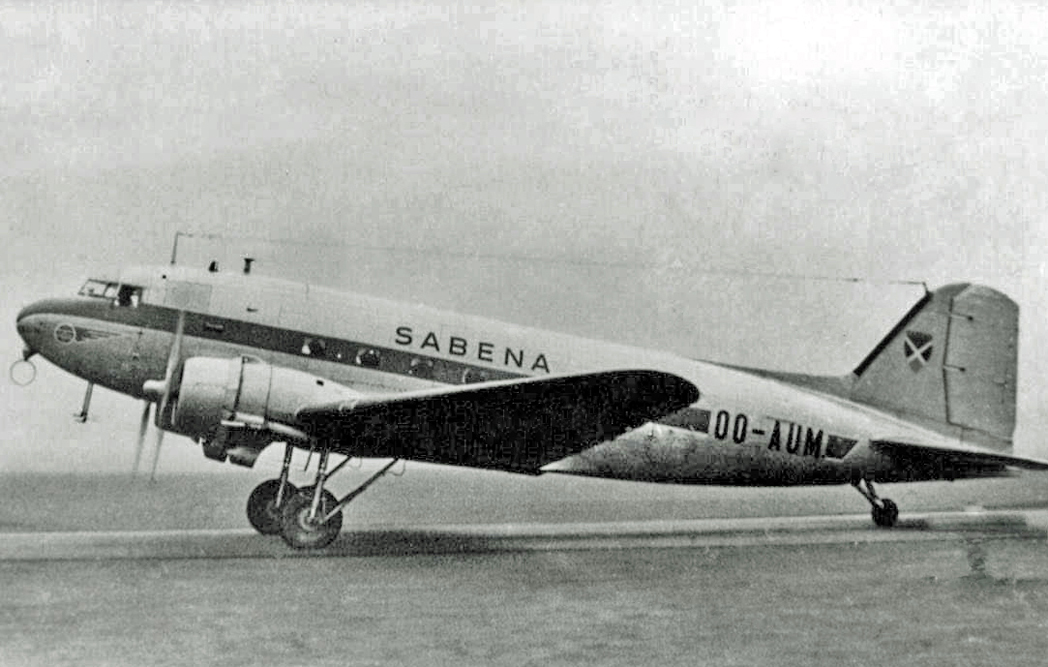
- A Douglas DC-3 resembling the one involved in the accident.

Accident
- Date: 31 August 1948
- Site: Near Kimbwe, Belgian Congo
- Total fatalities: 13
- Total survivors: 0

Aircraft
- Aircraft type: Douglas C-47
- Operator: Sabena
- Registration: OO-CBL
- Flight origin: Manono
- Destination: Élizabethville (now Lubumbashi)
- Occupants: 13
- Passengers: 10
- Crew: 3
- Fatalities: 13
- Survivors: 0

The 1948 Sabena Douglas C-47 crash was an aviation accident that occurred on 31 August 1948, near Kimbwe, in the Belgian Congo. The aircraft, a Douglas C-47A-10-DK registered as OO-CBL, was operated by the Belgian airline Sabena. It was en route from Manono to Élizabethville (now Lubumbashi), when it suddenly went out of control during its approach to the airport and crashed during the emergency landing. All 13 people on board, including three crew members, were killed. The exact cause of the crash remains undetermined despite favorable weather conditions at the time.

It was one of three fatal crashes that Sabena experienced in 1948, along with the Heathrow disaster on March 2, and the Sabena Douglas DC-4 crash on May 12.

== Flight ==
The flight was a scheduled passenger flight from Costermans City via Manono to Élizabethville (now Lubumbashi) on 31 August 1948. The flight was operated by Sabena with a Douglas DC-3 aircraft. The aircraft carried 13 people, including 3 crew members.

== Search operation ==
After the aircraft took off from Manono it went missing. A rescue operation started with all available aircraft. Apart from that motorized units searched in the region of Jadoth City and Élizabethville.

On 7 September, a week after the crashed, it was announced had that the plane had to made an emergency landing. All thirteen people on board were killed.
