= 1949 Sabena DC-3 Crash =

1949 aviation accident

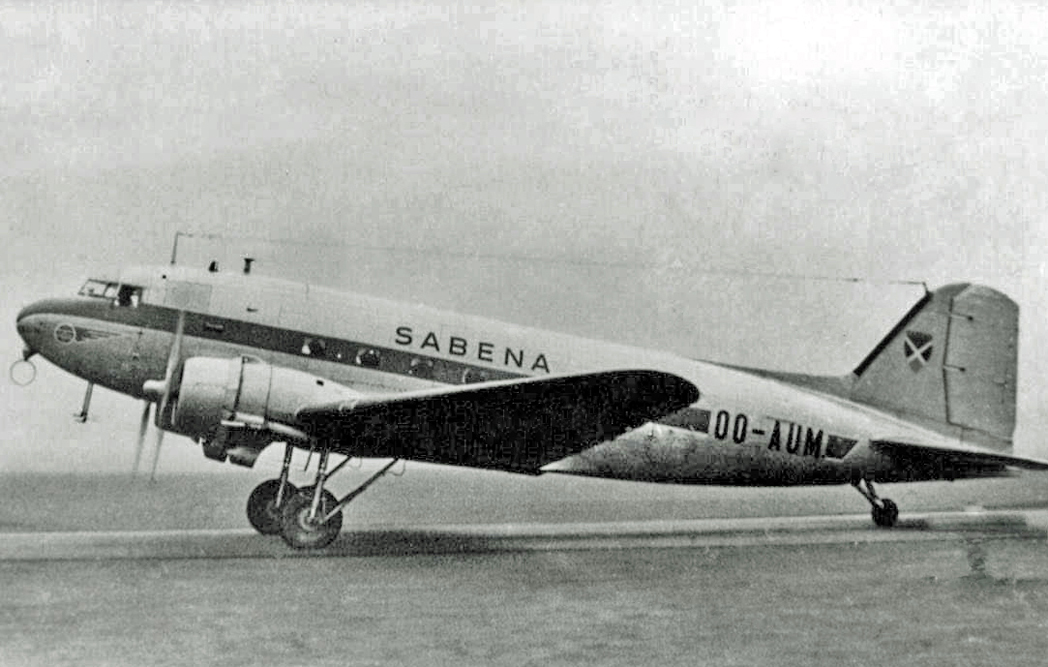
- A Sabena DC-3 in 1949, similar to the aircraft involved in the accident.

Accident
- Date: 18 December 1949
- Summary: Loss of control after an in-flight structural failure of the wing
- Site: 4 km southeast of the Le Bourget Airport near Aulnay-sous-Bois

Aircraft
- Aircraft type: Douglas DC-3
- Operator: Sabena
- Registration: OO-AUQ
- Flight origin: Paris-Le Bourget Airport (LBG/LFPB), France
- Destination: Brussels-Zaventem Airport (BRU/EBBR), Belgium
- Occupants: 8
- Passengers: 4
- Crew: 4
- Fatalities: 8
- Injuries: 0
- Survivors: 0

The 1949 Sabena DC-3 Crash was the crash of a Douglas DC-3 of the Belgian airline Sabena in Aulnay-sous-Bois, France, on 18 December 1949. All eight people on board die in the incident.

== Aircraft ==
The Douglas DC-3 involved was built in 1946 with serial number 10241 and registration OO-AUQ and was used by the Belgian airline company Sabena from 12 August 1946 until its destruction in 1949.

== Crash ==
The Sabena flight departed Le Bourget Airport bound for Zaventem Airport with four passengers and four crew members on board at 20.30 pm on 18 December 1949. Shortly after takeoff while still climbing, the aircraft fired a green and red rocket as a sign of distress before flying low over the rooftops of the surrounding neighborhood. After reaching a maximum height of only a few hundred feet, one of the wings separated and sent the aircraft in an uncontrolled dive towards the ground.

The plane crashed 4 km southeast of the airport near Aulnay-sous-Bois after clipping a house and burst into flames. The impact with the house caused damage to the corner of the house and toppled a chimney, but the occupants of the house were unharmed. After striking the house, the plane crashed in a field about 600 yards (550 m) away and buried itself deep in the ground. The flight avoided hitting a crowded movie theater nearby. Firefighters, Police officers and airport employees reached the crash site to aid any survivors but it was discovered that all eight onboard had perished in the flaming wreckage. One firefighter and a local inhabitant were injured in the rescue attempt and taken to the hospital.

Nationality	Passengers		Crew		Total	
Nationality	Total	Killed	Total	Killed	Total	Killed
Belgium	2	2	4	4	6	6
United States	1	1	0	0	1	1
Egypt	1	1	0	0	1	1
Total	4	4	4	4	8	8

== Probable cause ==
The cause of the crash was determined to be caused by the in-flight structural failure of the wing, but the reason for the wing's failure remains unknown.

== Aftermath ==
The aircraft was destroyed by the impact and post-crash fire and the bodies of the victims were recovered by rescue workers.
