= Sabena =

National airline of Belgium (1923–2001)

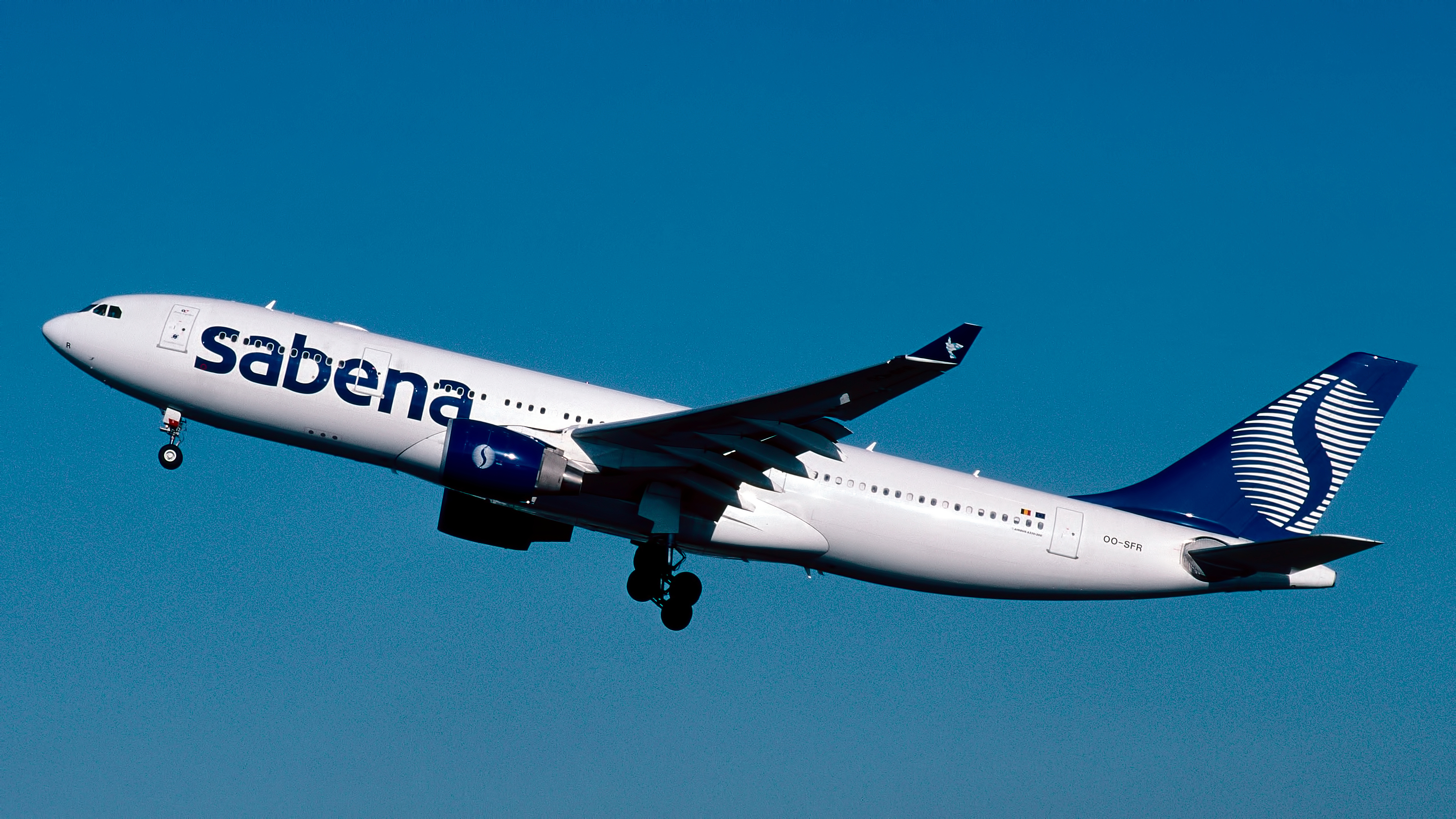
- Airbus A330-200
IATA	ICAO	Call sign
SN	SAB	SABENA
- Commenced operations: 23 May 1923
- Ceased operations: 7 November 2001 (assets transferred to Delta Air Transport, which later became SN Brussels Airlines)
- Hubs: Brussels Airport
- Frequent-flyer program: Qualiflyer
- Subsidiaries: Delta Air Transport (1996–2001); Sobelair (1949–2001)
- Headquarters: Zaventem, Belgium
- Key people: Christoph Mueller (CEO); Jean Louis Herremans (CFO)

The Société anonyme belge d'Exploitation de la Navigation aérienne (French; lit. 'Belgian Corporation for the Exploitation of Aerial Navigation', Dutch: Belgische Naamloze Vennootschap tot Exploitatie van het Luchtverkeer), better known by the acronym Sabena or SABENA, was the flag carrier of Belgium from 1923 to 2001, with its hub at Brussels Airport.

After its bankruptcy in 2001, SN Brussels Airlines was formed through a takeover of former subsidiary Delta Air Transport and took over part of Sabena's assets in February 2002. SN Brussels Airlines merged with Virgin Express in 2007 to form Brussels Airlines. The airline's corporate headquarters were located in the Sabena House on the grounds of Brussels Airport in Zaventem.

== History ==
=== 1923–1939: Beginnings ===
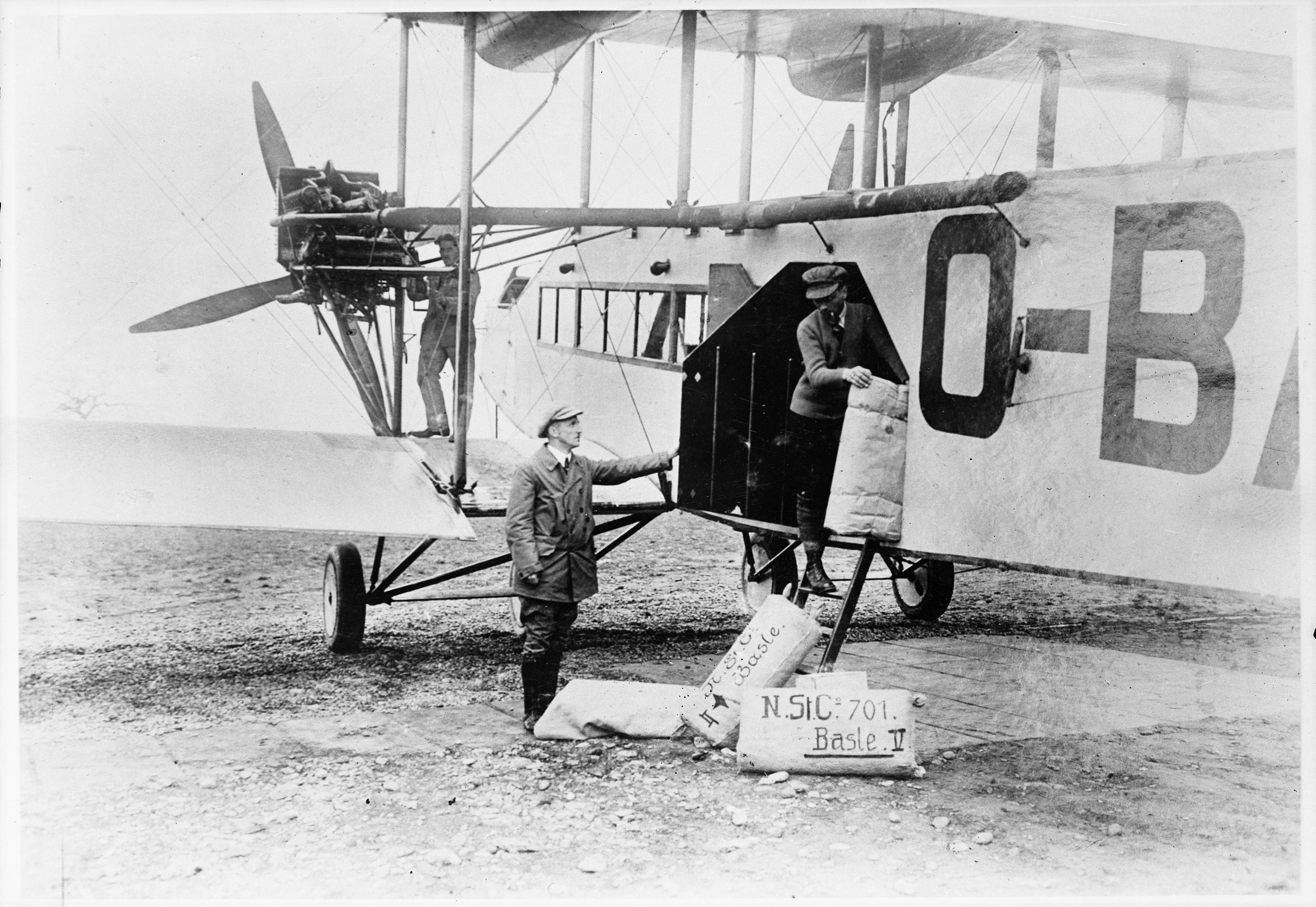
A Handley Page Type W unloads cargo in Switzerland in 1924

Sabena began operations on 23 May 1923 as the national carrier of Belgium. The airline was created by the Belgian government with help from the Devriendt family after its predecessor SNETA (Syndicat national pour l'étude des transports aériens, National Syndicate for the Study of Aerial Transports)—formed in 1919 to pioneer commercial aviation in Belgium—ceased operations. Sabena operated its first commercial flight from Haren, Brussels, to London (England) on 1 July 1923, via Ostend. Services to Rotterdam (Netherlands) and Strasbourg (France) were launched on 1 April 1924. The Strasbourg service was extended to Basel (Switzerland) on 10 June 1924. Amsterdam (Netherlands) was added on 1 September 1924, and Hamburg (Germany) followed on 1 May 1929 via Antwerp, Düsseldorf, and Essen.

==== Belgian Congo ====
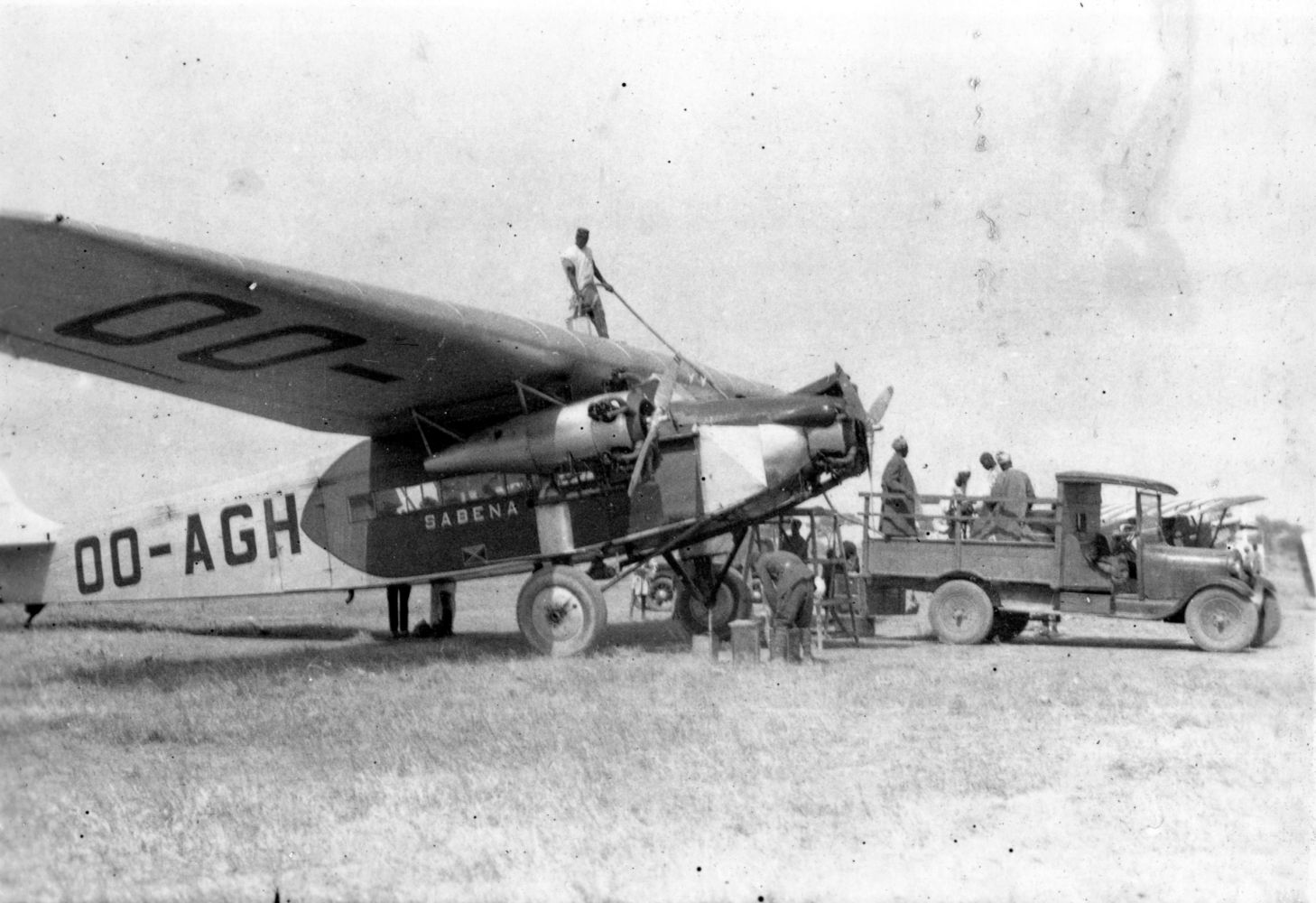
A Fokker F.VII refueling at Zinder (Niger)

When Sabena was created, the airline was partly funded by Belgians in the Belgian Congo colony who had lost their air service, an experimental passenger and cargo company (LARA) between Léopoldville, Lisala, and Stanleyville, a year earlier. They expected the new Belgian national airline to fill this gap. On 12 February 1925, Sabena aviators Edmond Thieffry, Léopold Roger, and Joseph De Brycker succeeded in the feat of flying their Handley Page W8 F biplane from Brussels, the capital of Belgium, to Léopoldville (now Kinshasa), the capital of the Belgian Congo, pioneering a long-haul route for passengers traveling between Europe and Africa, and King Albert's daughter, Princess Marie-José, flew the route on 3 April. Throughout its history, Sabena had a long tradition of service to African destinations, and for a long time, these were the only profitable routes served by the airline.

Sabena used land planes for its Congo operations, and a program of aerodrome construction was initiated in the Congo. This was finished in 1926, and Sabena immediately began flights within the Belgian colony, the main route being Boma-Léopoldville-Élisabethville, a 2,288 km (1,422 mi) route over dense jungle. First, flights were operated with De Havilland DH.50s, although these were quickly replaced by the larger Handley Page W.8f which had three engines and offered ten seats.

By 1931 Sabena's fleet, including the aircraft used on the Congo network, totalled 43 aircraft. Its mainstay type was the Fokker F.VIIB, with a lesser number of smaller Fokker VIIA and 14 Handley-Page types. It also flew British Westland Wessex aircraft.

Sabena occasionally flew to tropical Africa, Belgium's Congo colony, but mostly these aircraft were shipped out. There was no direct flight yet between Belgium and the colony. As the 1930s progressed, Sabena cooperated with Air France and Deutsche Luft Hansa, which also had interests in routes to destinations across Africa.

Sabena's first long-haul flight to the Congo occurred on 12 February 1935 and took five and a half days, for which Sabena used a Fokker F-VII/3m aircraft. The following year, Sabena purchased the Savoia-Marchetti SM.73 airliner. With a speed of 300 km/h (200 mph), it reduced the journey time to only four days, and the Sabena service ran on alternate weeks to an Air Afrique service.

==== Expansion in Europe ====
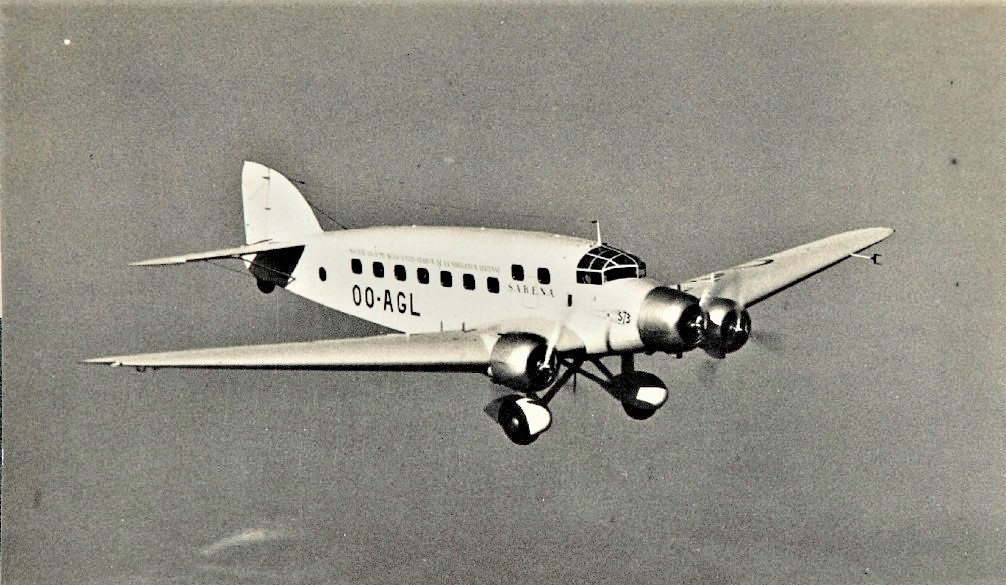
A Savoia-Marchetti SM.73

In Europe, Sabena opened services to Copenhagen and Malmö in 1931, and a route to Berlin was initiated in 1932. The mainstay pre-war airliner that Sabena used in Europe was the successful Junkers Ju 52/3m airliner. The airline's pre-war routes covered almost 6,000 km within Europe. While the Brussels Haren Airport was Sabena's main base, the company also operated services from other Belgian airports and had a domestic network that was mainly used by businessmen who wanted to be in their coastal villas for the weekend.

In 1938, the airline purchased the new Savoia-Marchetti SM.83, a development of the S.M. 73 with a speed of 435 km/h (270 mph), although it flew services at a cruising speed of about 400 km/h (250 mph).

=== 1939–1946: Wartime ===
At the outbreak of World War II in 1939, Sabena's fleet totalled 18 aircraft. Its mainstay fleet type was the Savoia-Marchetti SM.73 airliner (it had 11 of the type) and the Junkers Ju 52/3m airliner (it had five). Sabena also had just taken delivery of two Douglas DC-3s. All European services were halted on 10 May 1940. During the war, the airline maintained its Belgian Congo routes.

=== 1946–1960: Transatlantic expansion ===
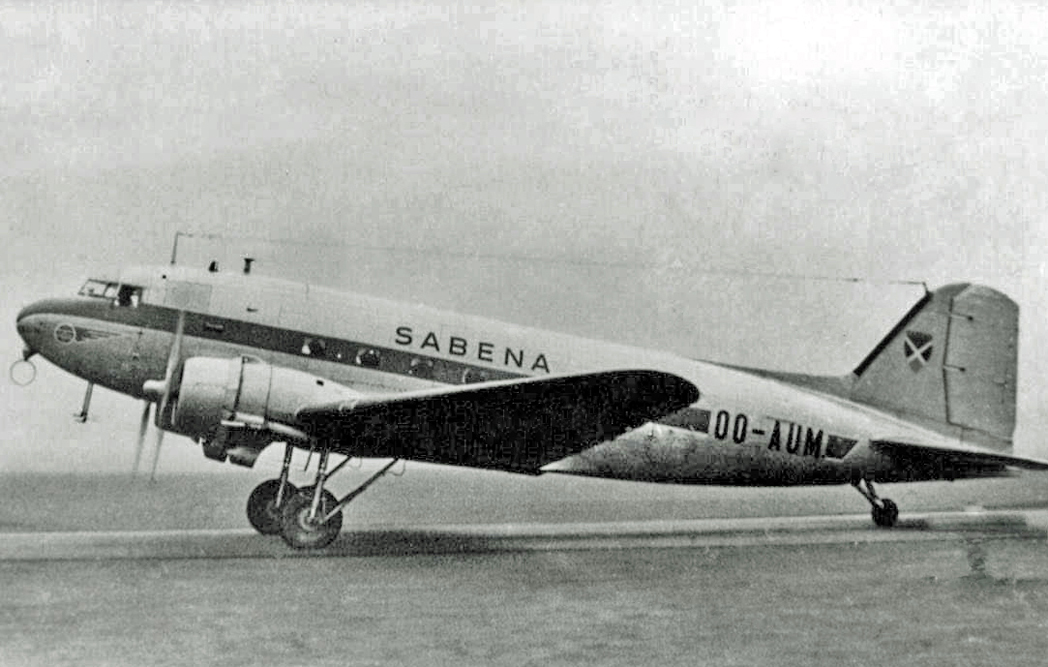
A Douglas DC-3 in 1949

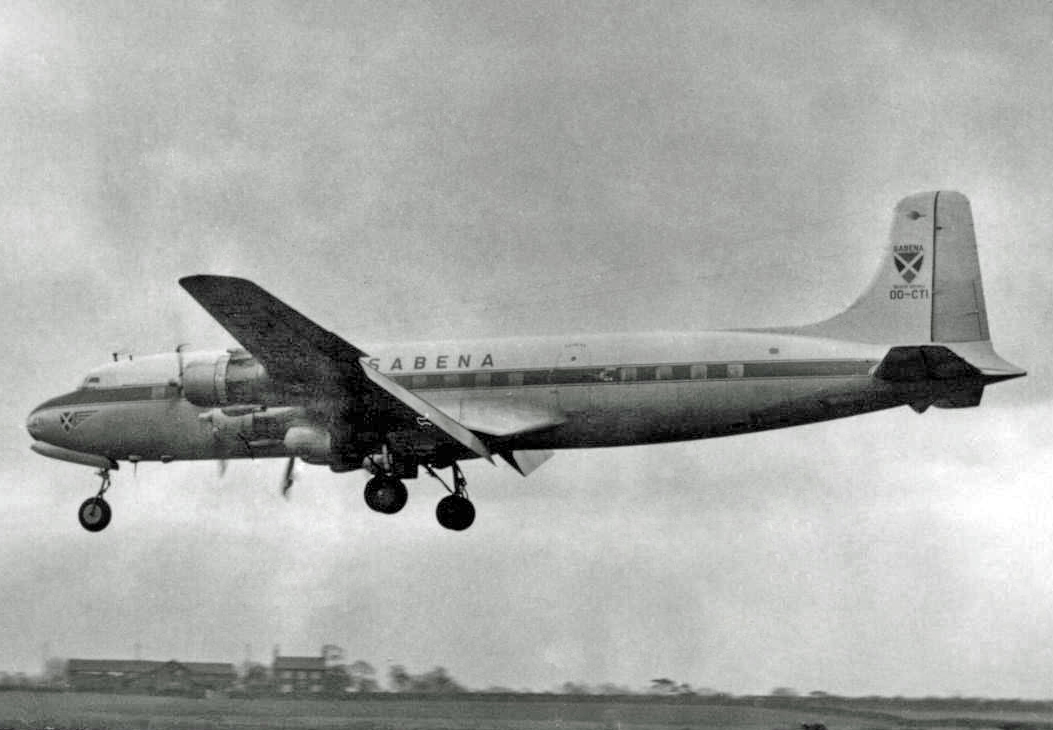
A Douglas DC-6B arriving at Manchester Airport in 1955

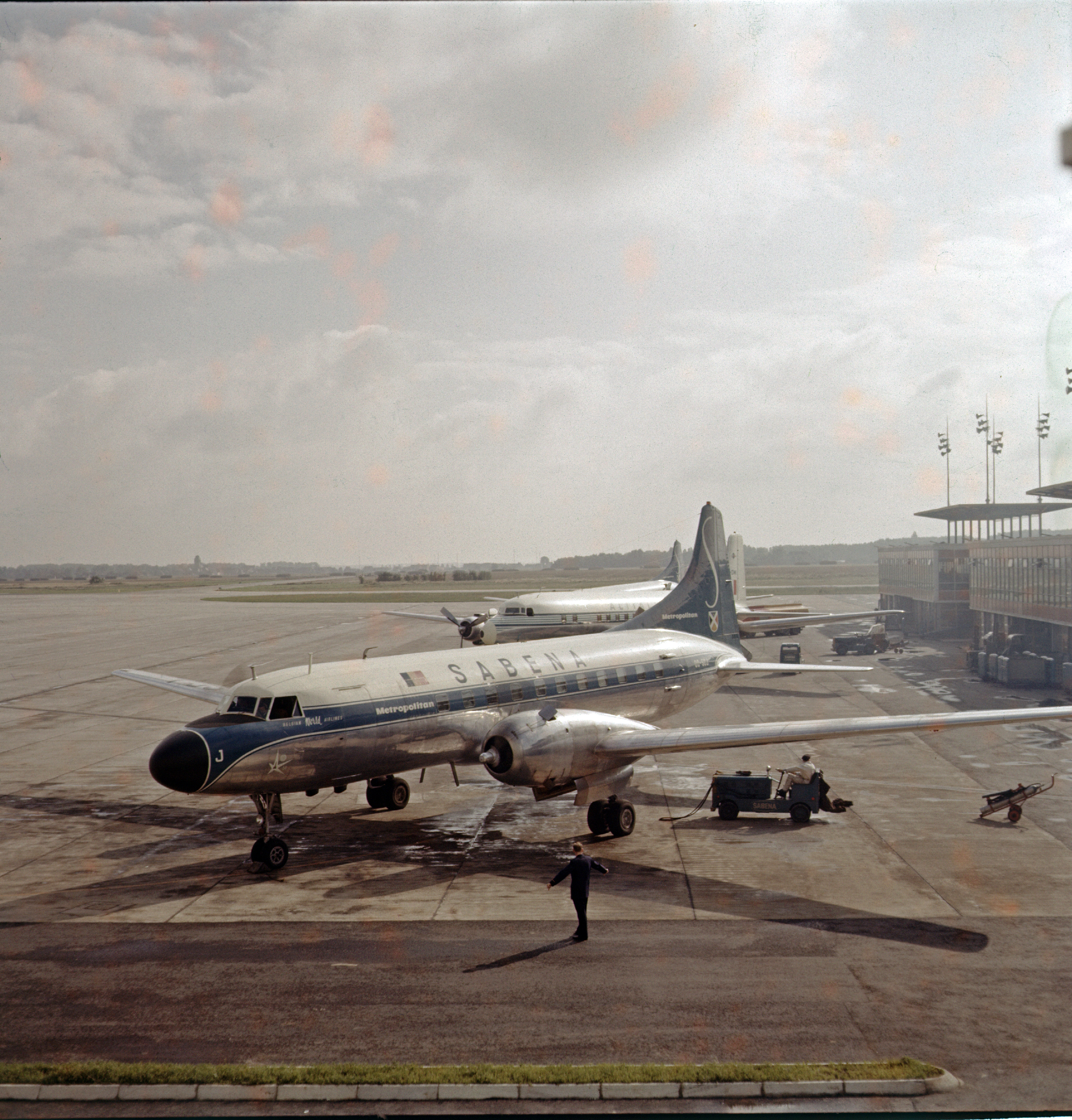
A Convair 440 in 1958

After the war, on 1 September 1945, Sabena resumed operating a network of intra-European scheduled services. The fleet initially consisted mainly of Douglas DC-3s. There were thousands of surplus Douglas C-47 Skytrains (the military variant of the DC-3) available to help airlines restart operations after the war. The airline now flew under the name of SABENA—Belgian World Airlines.

Sabena started its first transatlantic route to New York City on 4 June 1946, initially using unpressurised Douglas DC-4 airliners, which were augmented and later replaced by Douglas DC-6Bs. The DC-4s also restarted the airline's traditional route to the Belgian Congo. Sabena was the first airline to introduce transatlantic schedules from the north of England, when one of its DC-6Bs inaugurated the Brussels-Manchester-New York route on 28 October 1953.

The Convair 240 was introduced in 1949 to partially replace the DC-3s that until then had flown most European services. As of 1956, improved Convair 440 "Metropolitan" twins began replacing the Convair 240 twins and were used successfully well into the 1960s between European regional destinations.

In 1957, the long-range Douglas DC-7C was introduced for long-haul routes, but this plane would begin to be supplanted after only three years by the jet age. It remained in service on the transatlantic route until 1962.

On 3 June 1954, a Soviet Air Force Mikoyan-Gurevich MiG-15 (NATO reporting name "Fagot") attacked a Sabena-operated Douglas DC-3 on a cargo flight from the United Kingdom to Yugoslavia, killing the radio operator and wounding both the captain and engineer. Co-pilot Douglas Wilson managed to land in Austria, but the plane suffered significant damage.

For the 1958 world exposition in Brussels, Sabena leased two Lockheed Super Constellations from Seaboard World Airlines, using them mainly on transatlantic routes. In the same period, there were experiments with helicopter passenger service using Sikorsky S-58 aircraft from Brussels to Antwerp, Rotterdam, Eindhoven, and the Paris heliport at Issy-les-Moulineaux.

=== 1960–1990: The jet age ===
Revenue Passenger-Kilometers, scheduled flights only, in millions
Year	Traffic
1950	235
1955	579
1960	1,264
1965	1,635
1971	2,720
1975	3,796
1980	4,853
1989	6,760
1995	8,620
2000	19,379

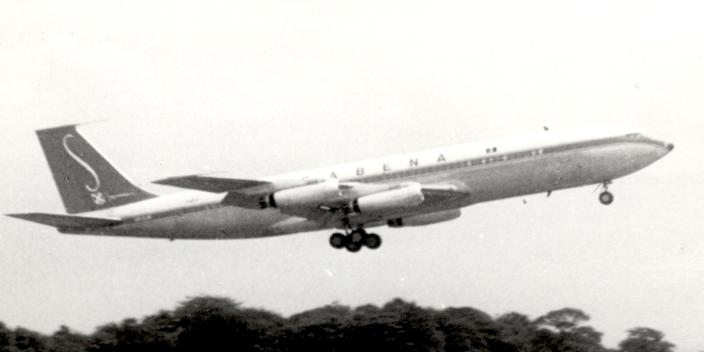
A Boeing 707-329 in April 1960, shortly after delivery

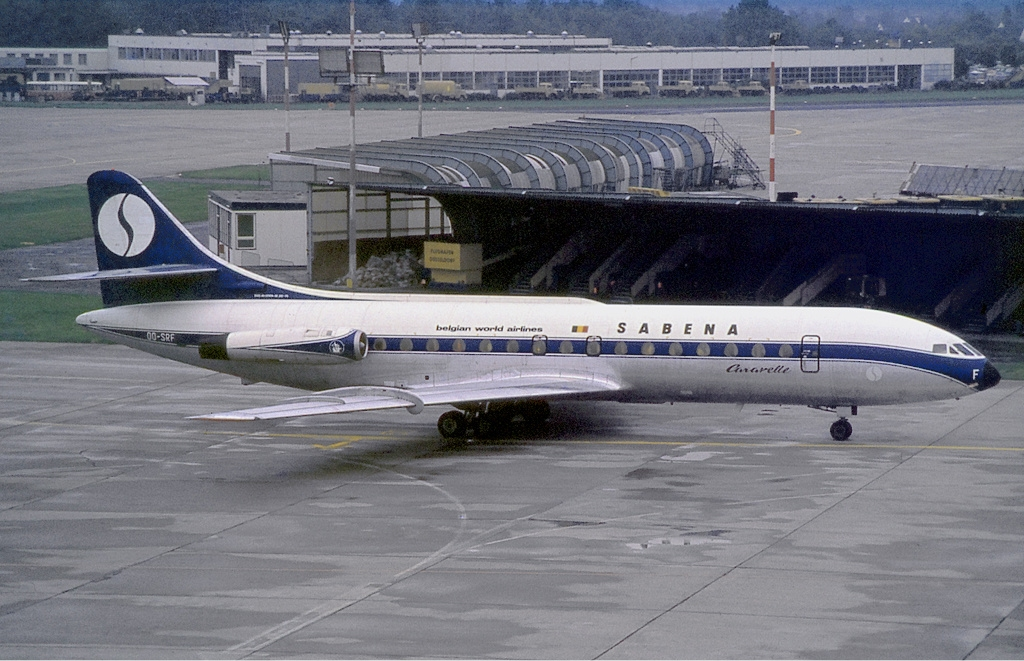
A Sud Aviation SE-210 Caravelle

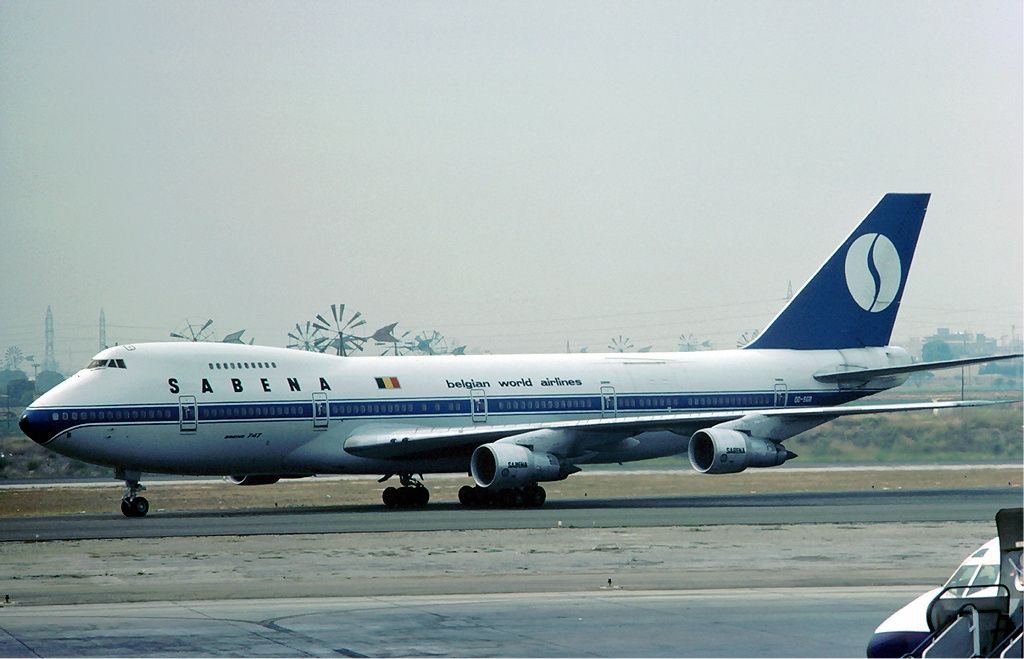
A Boeing 747-100 with revised tail colors in 1976

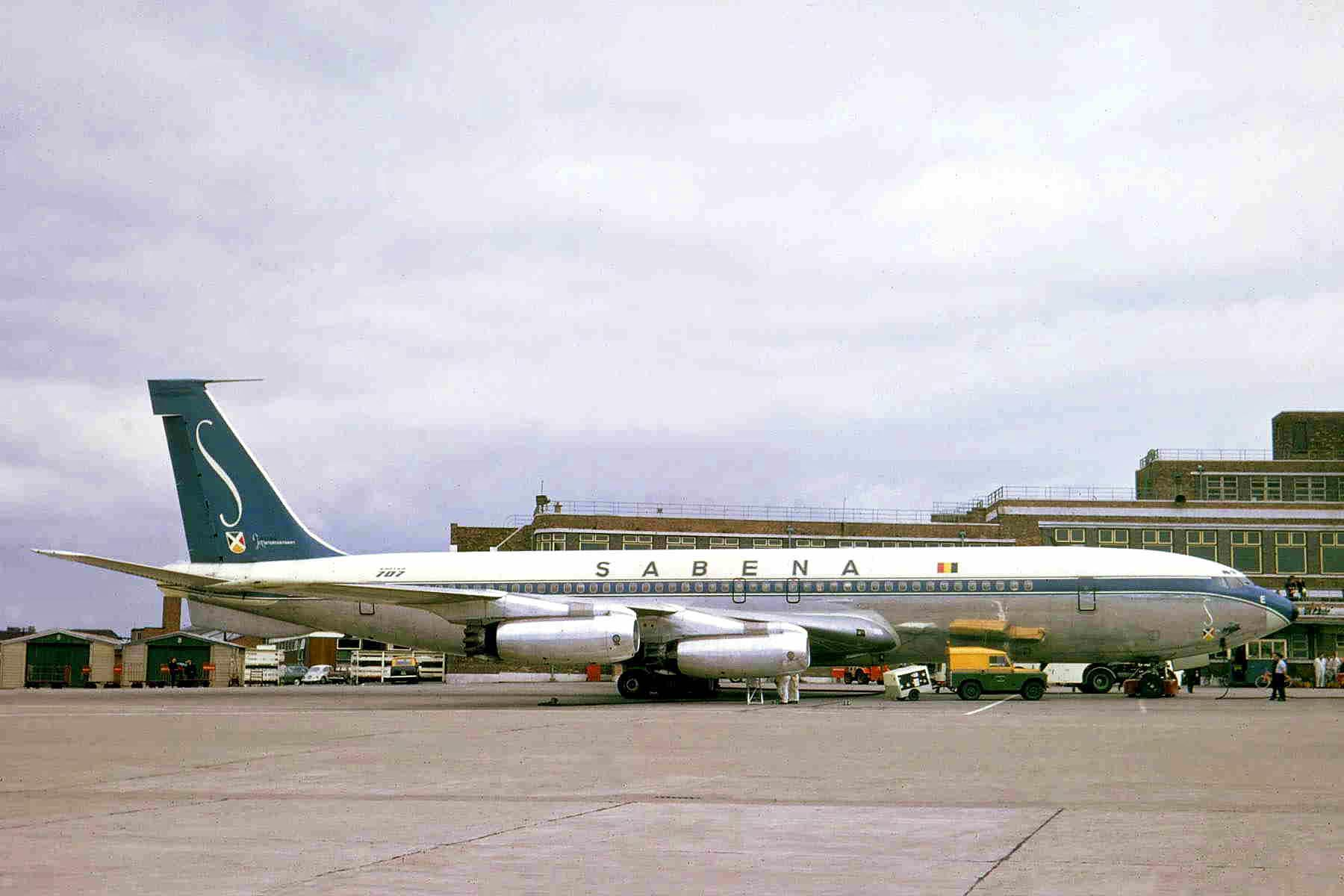
A Sabena Boeing 707 in 1981, close to the end of service

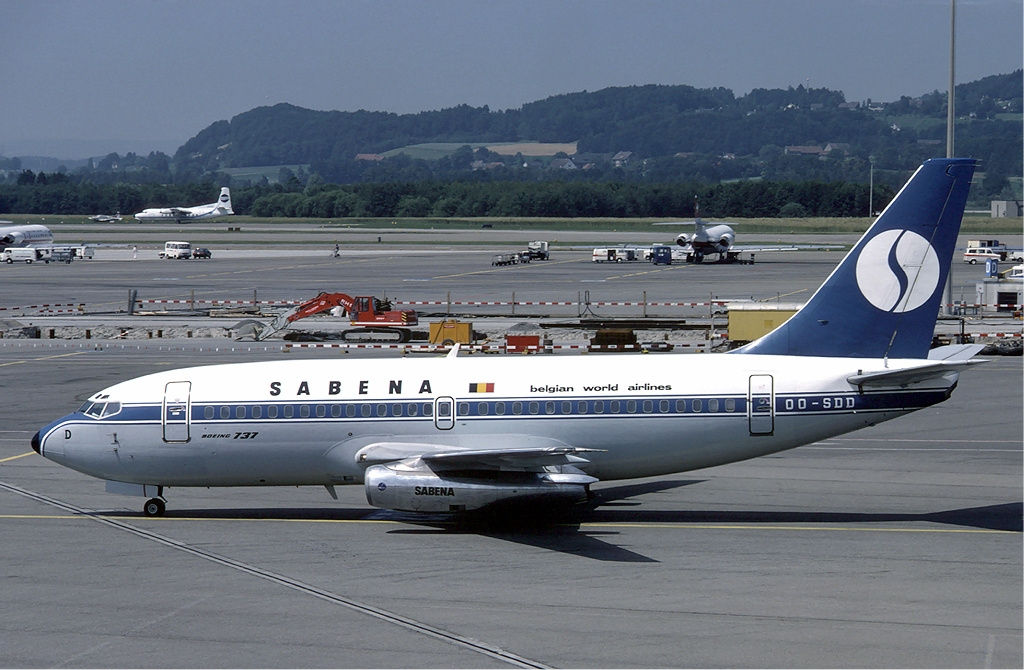
Boeing 737-200

1960 saw the introduction of the Boeing 707-320 intercontinental jet for trans-Atlantic flights to New York. SABENA was mainland Europe's first airline to operate a jet across the Atlantic (BOAC had been flying jet transatlantic services using the de Havilland Comet 4 since 4 October 1958). One of Sabena's aircraft became the first Boeing 707 to crash while in commercial service when Flight 548 crashed while preparing to land at the Brussels Airport on 15 February 1961. The United States Figure Skating Team was aboard the aircraft, en route from New York to Prague via Brussels to compete in a figure skating championship.

Six Caravelle jetliners were introduced on all medium-haul routes in Europe from February 1961, being flown on most routes alongside the Convair 440s until the early 1970s.

The beginning of the 1960s saw a major upheaval for Sabena in the Congo. Widespread rioting against Belgian colonials in the months leading up to and after the independence of the Democratic Republic of the Congo caused thousands of Belgians to flee the country. The Belgian government commandeered Sabena's entire long-haul fleet to get the refugees back to Europe. Independence also meant the end of the impressive regional network of routes that the airline had built up in the Congo since 1924. When the new republic began its own airline, Air Congo, in June 1961, Sabena held 30 percent of that airline's shares.

The Douglas DC-6Bs remained in service with Sabena in the mid-1960s, although they were no longer used on the airline's main routes. The Boeing 707s and Caravelles became the mainstay types during this decade. Boeing 727-100s were introduced on important European routes and also some African services from 1967 in a unique colour scheme; the fin markings incorporated a bare-metal rudder and white engine colours. At this time Fokker F27s entered service between regional Belgian airports and European destinations such as London Heathrow.

The Boeing 747-100 was introduced in 1971, on transatlantic routes flying alongside the Boeing 707-320Cs. Sabena, like many other transatlantic airlines, was satisfied with the Boeing 707s. For commercial reasons, it was recognised that it had to buy jumbo jets for its prestige services, notably New York JFK, and as of the mid-seventies, Chicago O'Hare. Sabena purchased only two first-generation jumbo jets, one named Tante Agathe (which means Aunt Agathe in French and Dutch, the national languages of Belgium), and it continued to fly the 707 into the early 1980s, as the Boeing 747-100's last flight occurred in 1993.

In 1973, the Boeing 727s on the European network were replaced by Boeing 737-200s. The McDonnell Douglas DC-10-30 entered service in 1974. In total, Sabena purchased five of these convertible (passenger and freight) combi aircraft wide-body jets.

In 1984 Airbus A310s were introduced on routes that had high passenger density. This aircraft type also introduced a modernisation of the 1973 Sabena livery, in which a lighter blue was used and the titles on the fuselage were in a more modern style.

In June 1986 the first of two Boeing 747-300 aircraft joined the fleet, eventually replacing the older 747-100s.

In 1989 Sabena invited Belgian fashion designer Olivier Strelli to create a new range of uniforms for its cabin crews.

=== 1990–1995: Sabena World Airlines ===
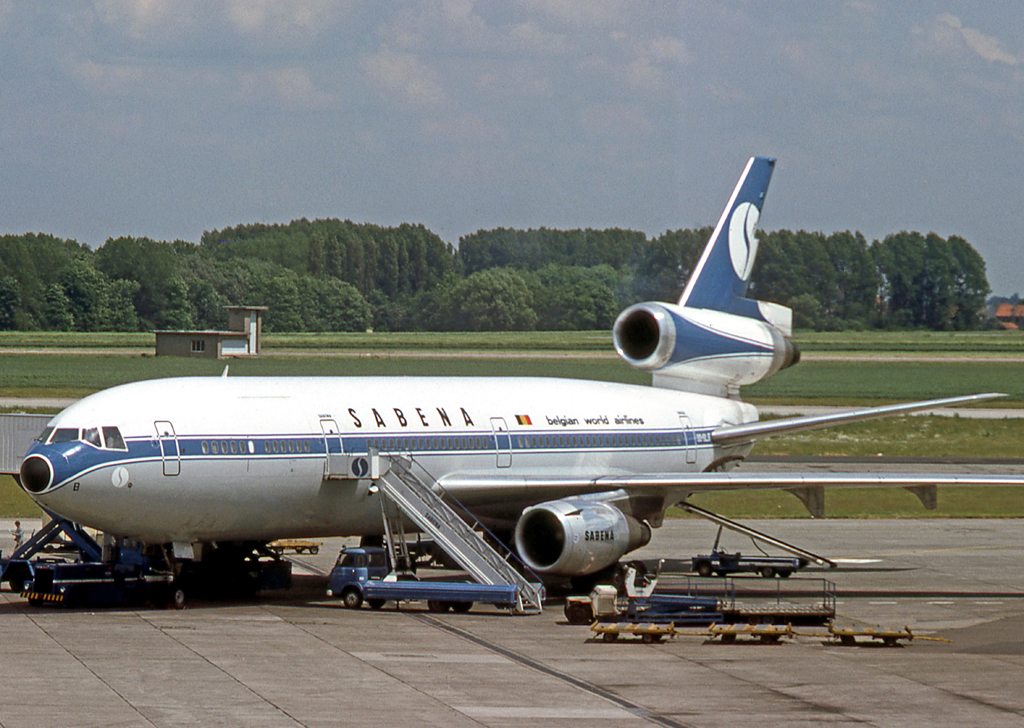
A Douglas DC-10-30CF convertible pax/freighter at Brussels Airport in 1977

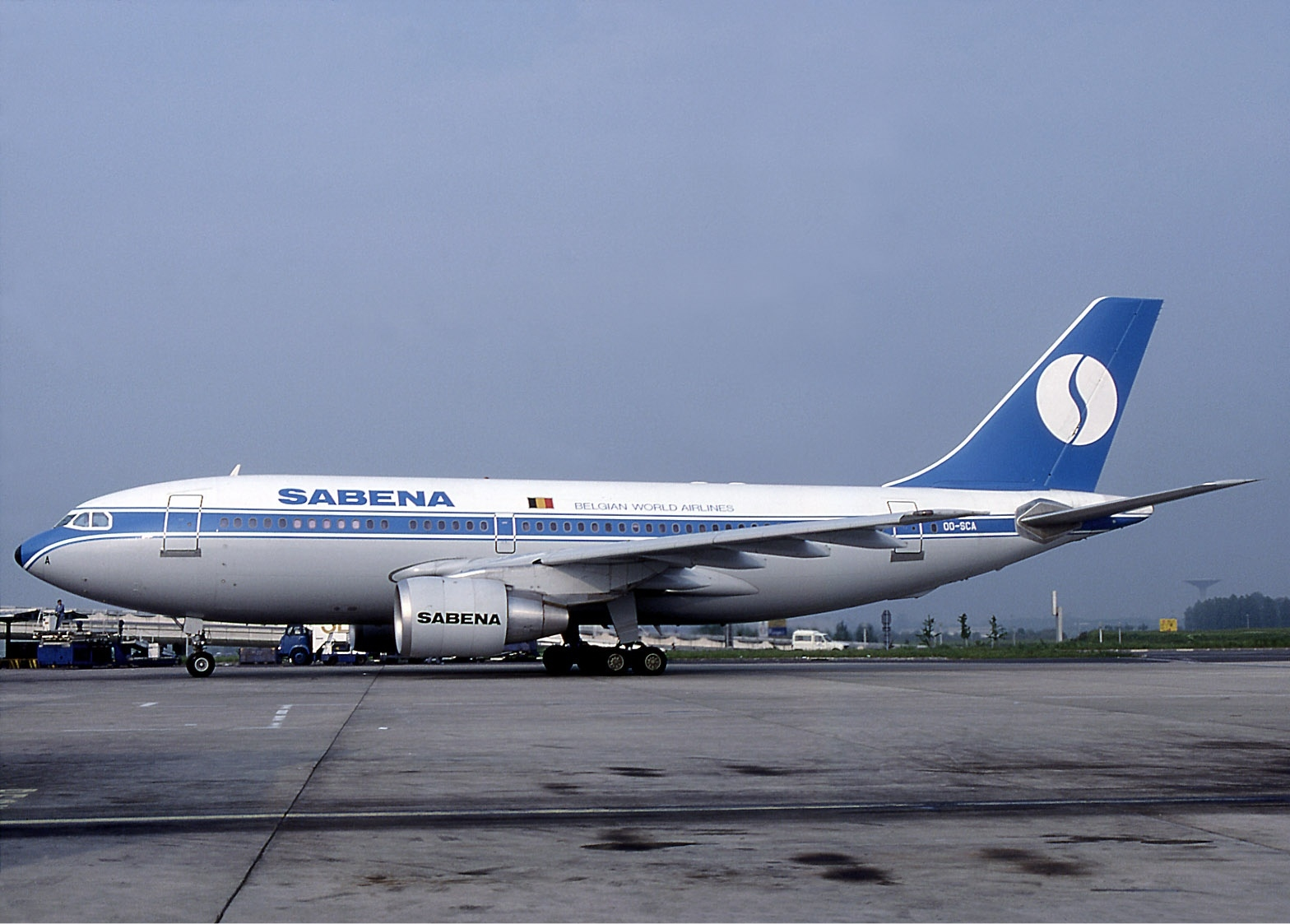
An Airbus A310 with updated titling in 1985

A new name, Sabena World Airlines, and colours were introduced for the 1990s. The new livery had an overall white colour and the white circle tail logo in blue on the fin. A large "Sabena" title covered the fuselage in light blue, and the name "Belgian World Airlines" was at times just visible, though the title was also painted on the fuselage in small, clear letters. The 1990s saw further fleet type renewal: the DC-10-30s were replaced with twin-engined Airbus A330s, and the Boeing 747s with four-engined Airbus A340s.

After the liberalisation of the airline industry throughout Europe and the economic consequences of the Gulf War, the Belgian government, the main shareholder of the company, realized that Sabena had little chance of surviving on its own in this very competitive market and began searching for a suitable partner.

Sabena remained in a poor financial state, and year after year the Belgian government had to cover losses; however, it was prevented from providing new funds due to EU State Aid rules. For help in business due to their financial problems, Sabena leased a couple of Boeing 747s from Air France. Many more aircraft were leased for longer periods but had to keep their distinctive French registration numbers.

Around 1987, the Belgian authorities blocked the merger attempt between SAS and the carrier. British Airways and KLM purchased stakes in Sabena in 1989 but later sold them back to the Belgian government. In 1993, Air France purchased a large minority stake in Sabena, which it sold soon after. Finally, in 1995, Swissair purchased a 49 percent stake in Sabena and took over management.

In 1993 Sabena adopted its third and final logo, and its head office was in the Air Terminus building on Rue Cardinal Mercier in Brussels.

In 1994, Paul Rusesabagina, a manager for Sabena-owned hotels in the former Belgian territory of Rwanda, sheltered over 1200 Tutsis and moderate Hutus at the Hôtel des Mille Collines of Kigali, saving them from being slaughtered by the Interahamwe militia during the Rwandan genocide (this is depicted in the 2004 motion picture Hotel Rwanda).

=== 1995–2001: Swissair control ===
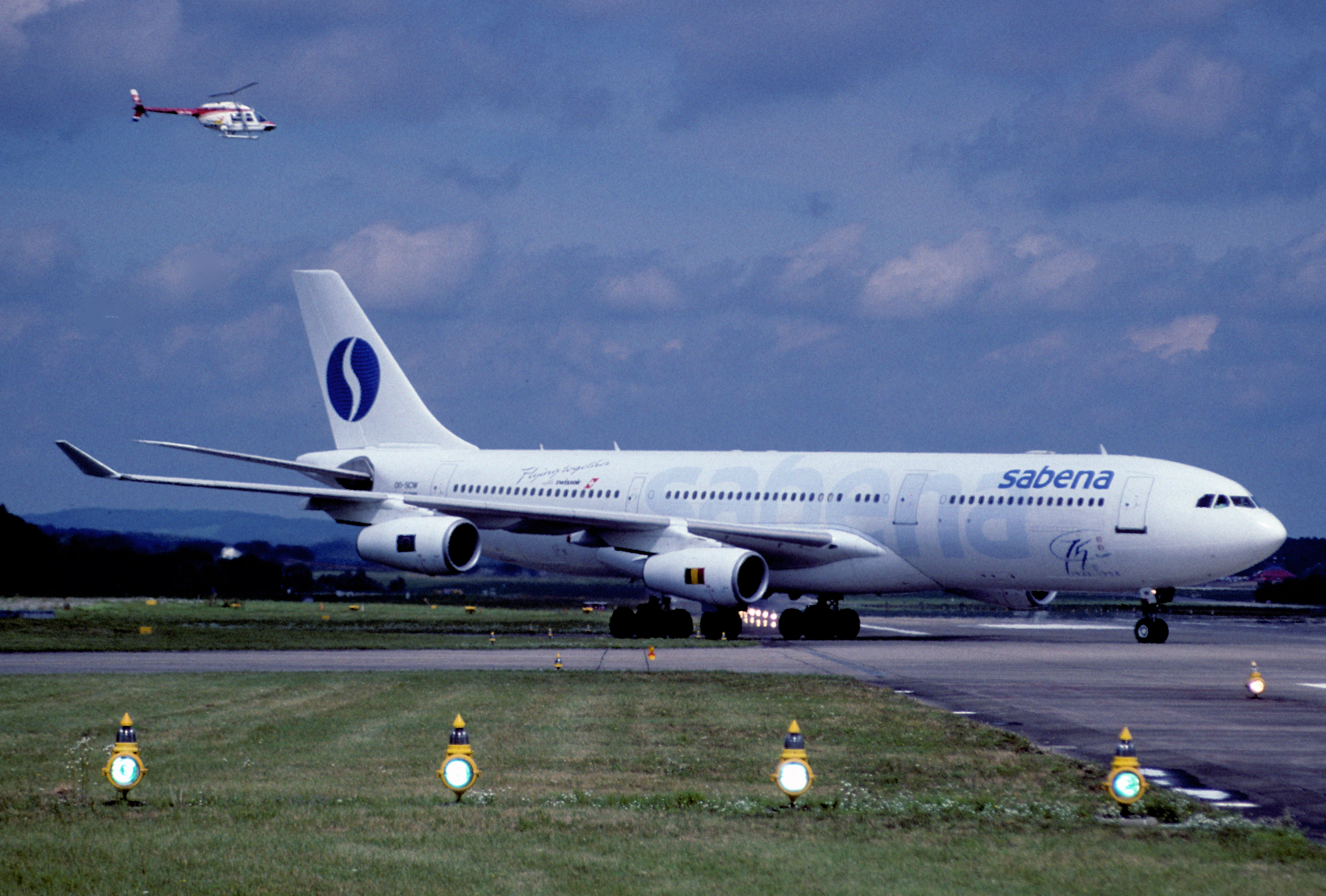
To replace their old Boeing 747s, Sabena purchased many Airbus A340s

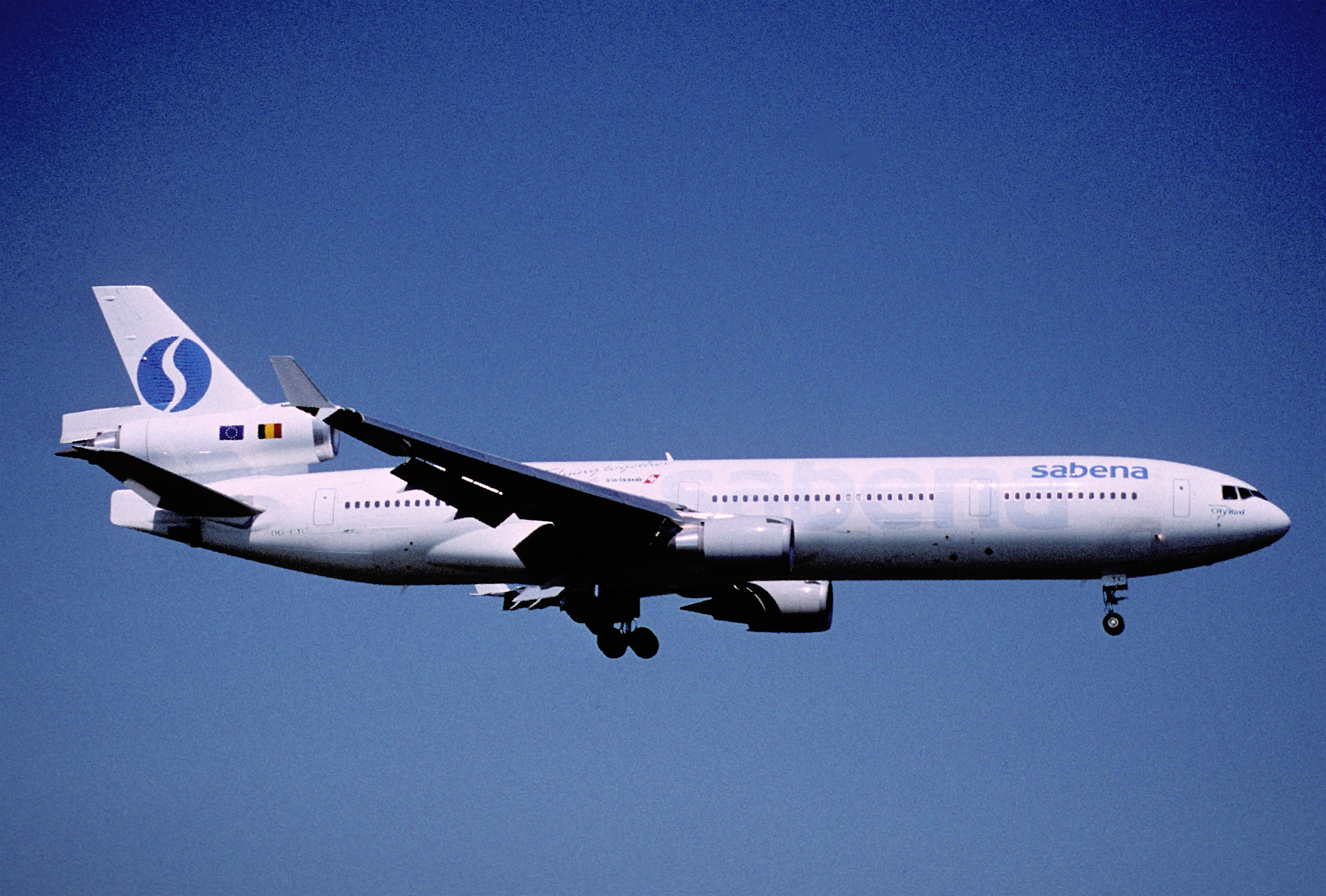
McDonnell Douglas MD-11

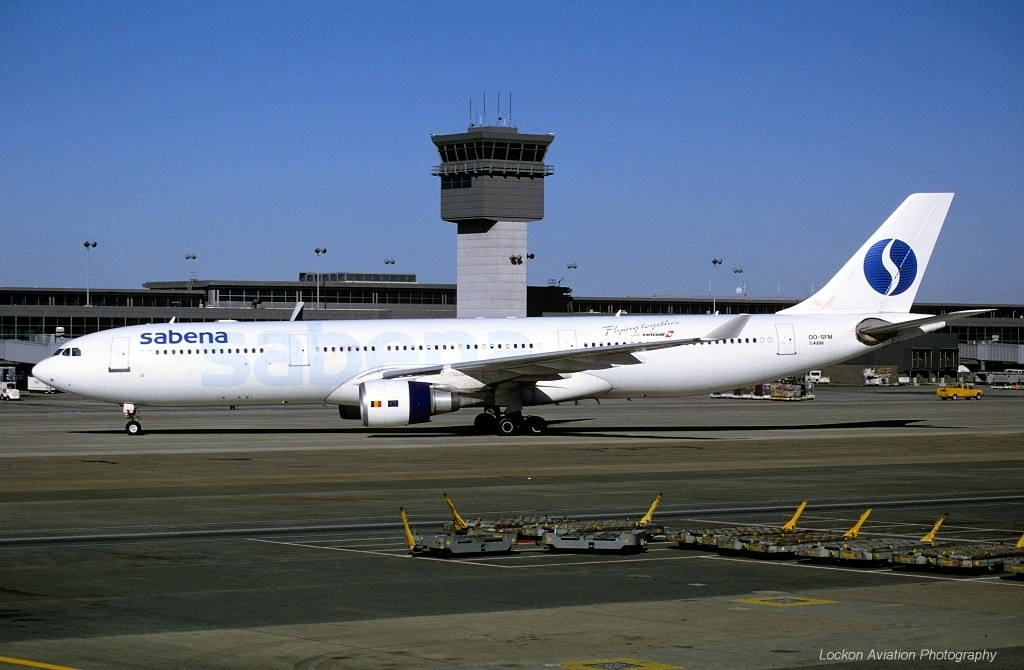
Airbus A330-300

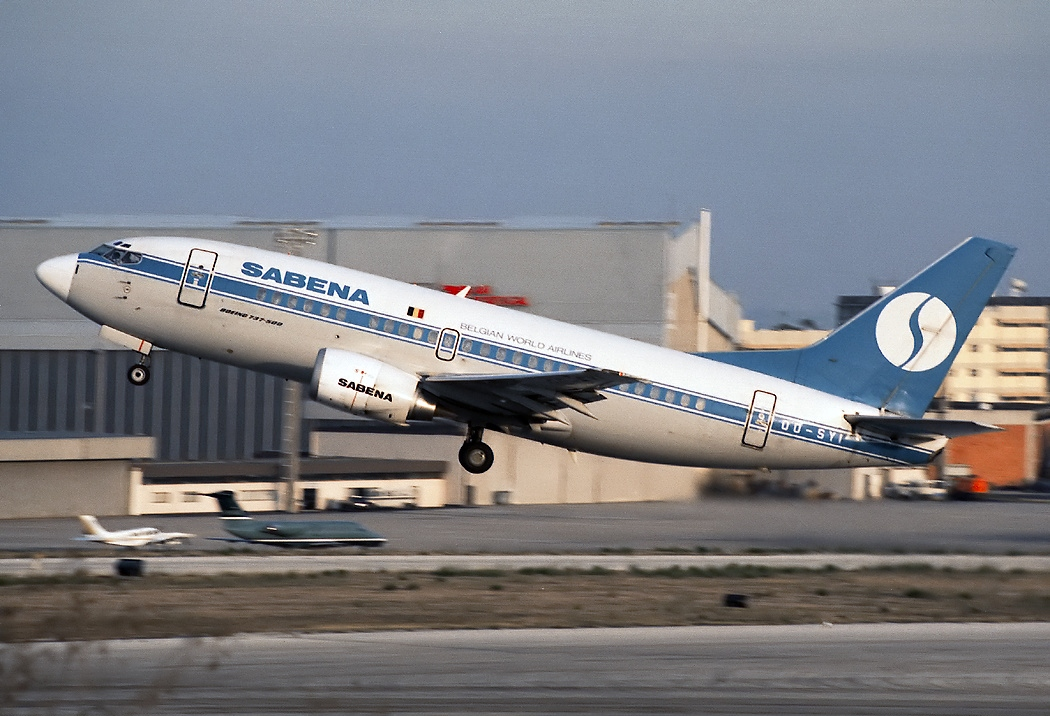
A Boeing 737-500

When Swissair took over management of the airline, a few modifications were made to the aircraft's liveries, including a sticker saying, "Flying together with Swissair." In March and April 1998 two McDonnell-Douglas MD-11 aircraft, both leased from CityBird, joined the fleet, and such long-haul destinations as Newark, Montreal, and São Paulo were (re)introduced. Also, that year saw the delivery of the last passenger version of the MD-11 from Boeing, which merged with McDonnell Douglas a year before.

The year 1999 saw new colours introduced to the fleet, beginning with an Airbus A340. One of the latest fleet types that Sabena introduced, right after the A321 and A320, was the A319, which saw service in 2000. These new planes were part of a record order of 34 Airbus A320 family aircraft, imposed on Sabena when under Swissair management.

=== 2001: Bankruptcy ===
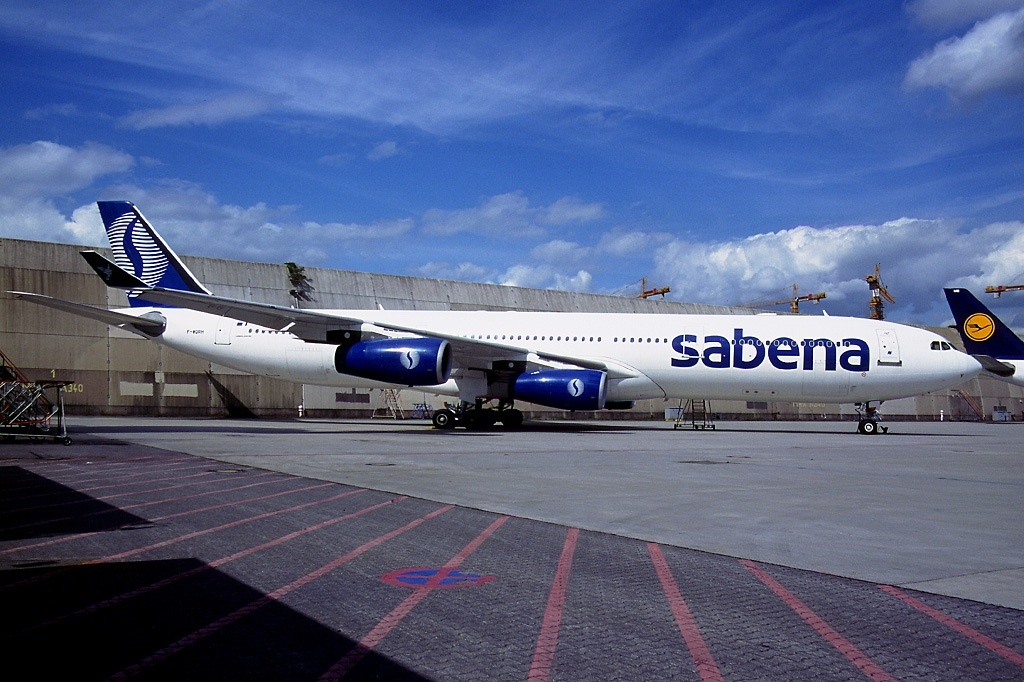
Airbus A340

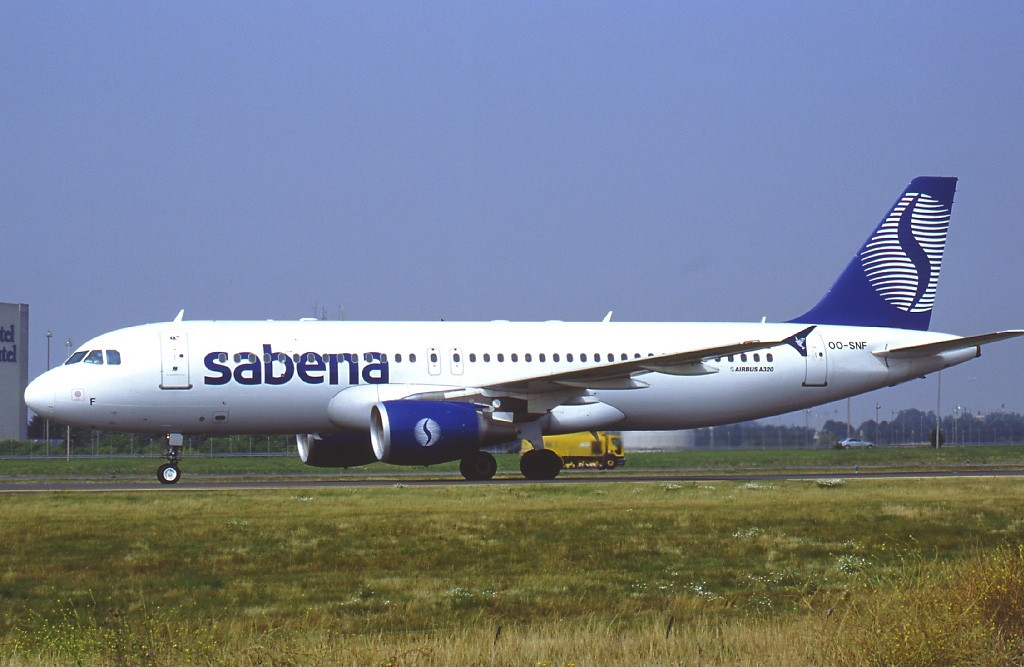
Airbus A320

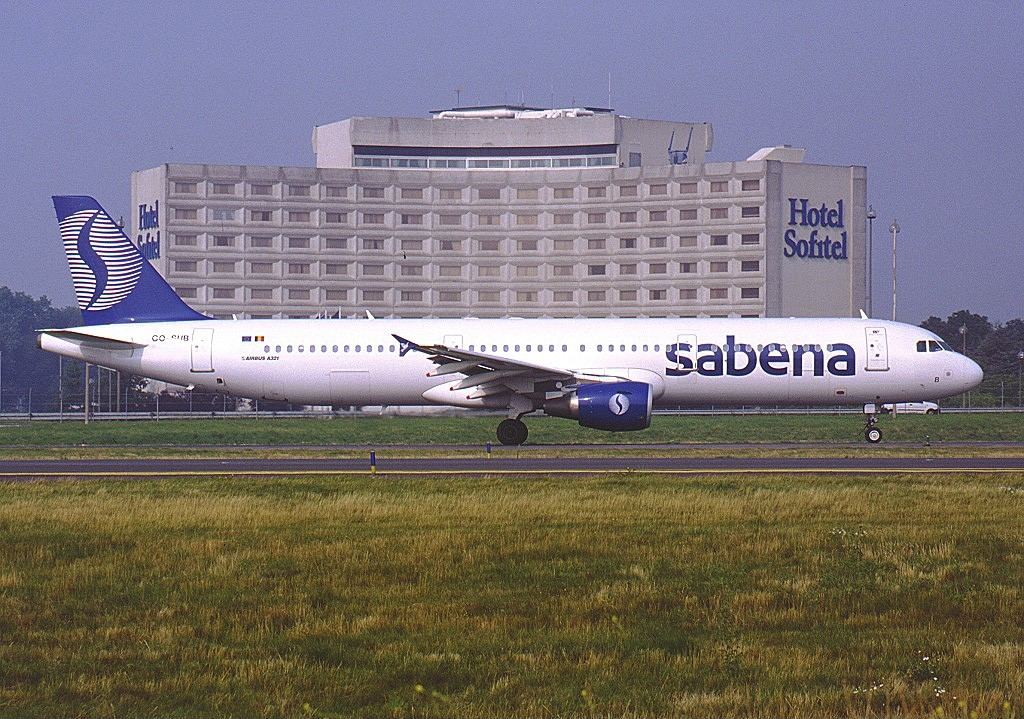
Airbus A321

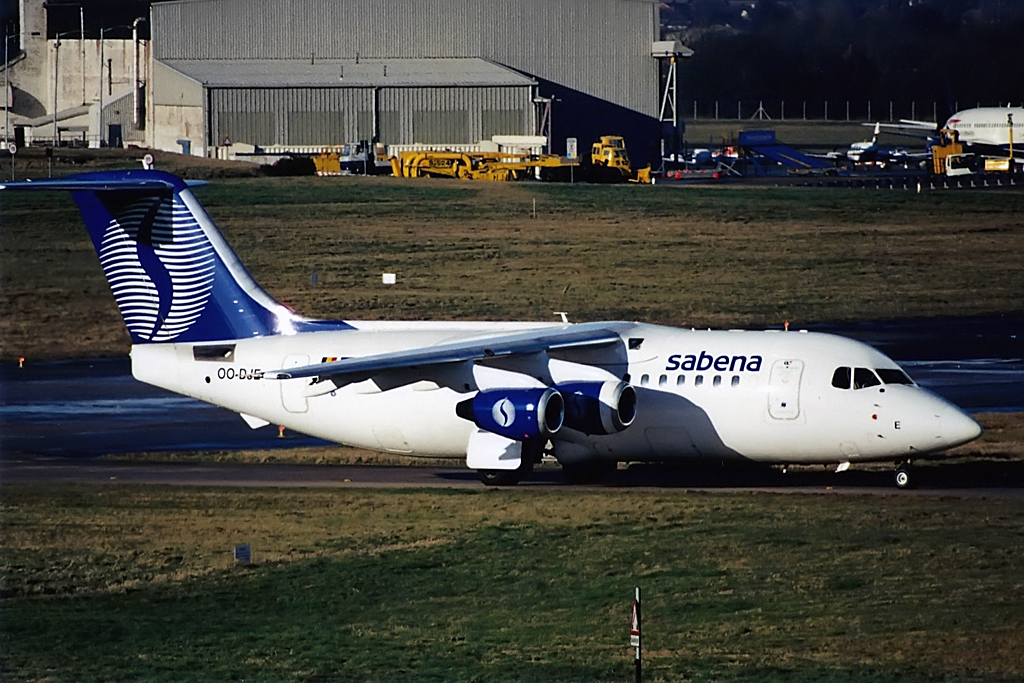
BAe 146 at Birmingham in 2001

After an airline recession and the effects on the airline industry of the September 11 attacks in 2001, all airlines that flew across the Atlantic suffered. Swissair had pledged to invest millions in Sabena but failed to do so, partly because the airline had financial problems itself, having filed for bankruptcy protection one month prior. Sabena filed for legal protection against its creditors on 3 October and went into liquidation on 6 November 2001. Fred Chaffart, chairman of the board of directors of Sabena, read a declaration on this day to explain the decision.

On 7 November 2001, was the final day of operations for Sabena. Flight 690 (operated by an Airbus A340-311 registered as OO-SCZ) from Abidjan, Ivory Coast, and Cotonou, Benin, was the last Sabena flight to land in Brussels. The flight had 266 passengers and eleven crew members.

A group of investors managed to take over Delta Air Transport, one of Sabena's subsidiaries, and transformed it into SN Brussels Airlines. That airline merged with Virgin Express in 2006 to form a new company, Brussels Airlines.

The Belgian Parliament formed a committee to investigate the reasons behind the bankruptcy of Sabena and the involvement of Switzerland's flag carrier. At the same time, the company's administrator investigated possible legal steps against Swissair and its successors in interest, Swiss International Air Lines and Lufthansa.

In 2006, the Belgian government, a former major shareholder, filed criminal charges against the former Swissair management. The former Swissair management was condemned by the judges.

On 16 January 2007, the Belgian-Flemish news program Terzake reported that during the 1990s, several members of the board were paid large sums illegally through a Sabena affiliate in Bermuda. When Paul Reutlinger became the CEO of the company, he stopped the illegal payments. Terzake went on to state that this might explain why the Belgian board members remained quiet when it became apparent Swissair was exploiting Sabena and eventually drove the company into bankruptcy.

The reasons for the bankruptcy of Sabena are numerous. One of the direct causes was Swissair not living up to their contractual obligations and failing to inject necessary funds into the company. This was because at the time Swissair was having its own financial problems. In the so-called "Hotel Agreement," signed on 17 July 2001, Belgian prime minister Guy Verhofstadt met with Swissair boss Mario Corti, who agreed to inject €258 million into Sabena, but the sum was never paid. The purchase of 34 new Airbus A320 family planes, imposed under Swissair's management, was a burden with which Sabena could not cope.

After the bankruptcy, a parliamentary commission in Belgium was established to investigate the demise of the airline. The Belgian politicians got a part of the blame; Rik Daems, who, at the time, was Minister of Public Enterprises and Participations, Telecommunication, and Middle Classes, received the most criticism due to his lack of effort. Swissair itself went bankrupt in October 2001 and was liquidated in March 2002.

== Subsidiaries and affiliated airlines ==
- Sobelair was a subsidiary from 1949 till 2001.

- DAT Wallonie was established to improve regional connections to and from Liège. Operations began on 11 September 1990, on behalf of the parent company, but were discontinued the following year. Aircraft leased from other airlines were used.

- Air Meuse was a division of DAT Wallonie that was established on 11 September 1990. Flight operations on behalf of Sabena began in 1992 and ended on 21 August 1997. Initially, Embraer EMB 120 Brasilia twin-engine aircraft were used, and later, British Aerospace BAe-146-200 regional jetliners.

- DAT Delta Air Transport became a subsidiary in 1996.

== Destinations ==
The flight schedule of Sabena published in March 2001 comprised 33 cities in Europe, 17 in Africa, 6 in North America, and 4 in Asia. In addition to its air destinations, Sabena also had a ground shuttle service between Valenciennes, France, and Brussels Airport.

== Fleet ==
Sabena's fleet consisted of the following aircraft at the time of the bankruptcy in November 2001:

Sabena fleet
Aircraft	In service	Orders	Passengers			Notes
Aircraft	In service	Orders	C	Y	Total	Notes
Airbus A319-100	15	10	—	131	131	On order but never delivered.
Airbus A320-200	6	—	—	156	156	
Airbus A321-200	3	—	—	188	188	
Airbus A330-200	6	—	54	187	241	
Airbus A330-300	4	—	50	222	272	
Airbus A340-200	2	—	54	198	252	
Airbus A340-300	3	3	52	242	294	On order but never delivered.
Boeing 737-300	6	—	—	126	126	
Boeing 737-500	6	—	—	111	111	
McDonnell Douglas MD-11	2	—	48	249	297	Leased from CityBird. Last passenger version delivered in 1998.
Total	53	13				

During the time of the airline's existence, Sabena also operated these aircraft:

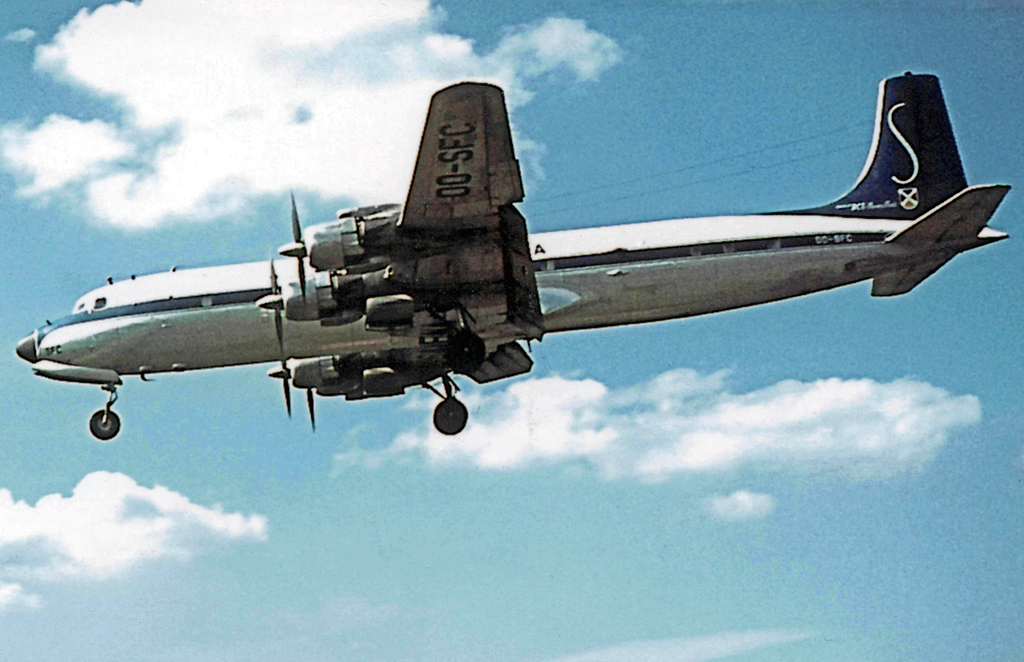
A Douglas DC-7C

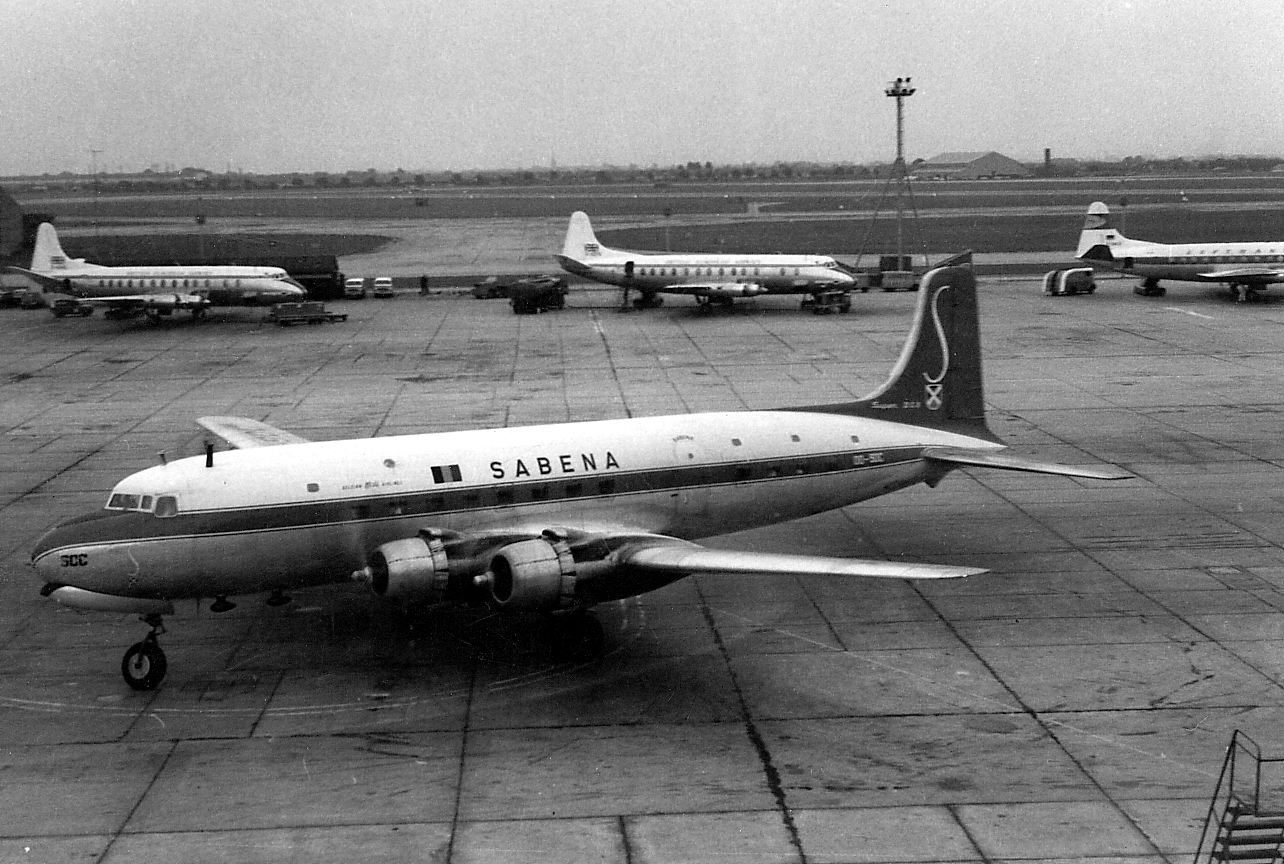
A Douglas DC-6 at Heathrow Airport in 1960

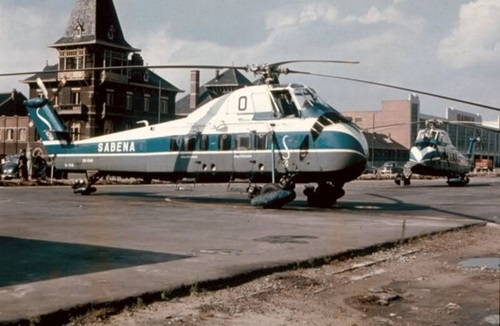
Sikorsky S-58s operated a short-lived inter-city network

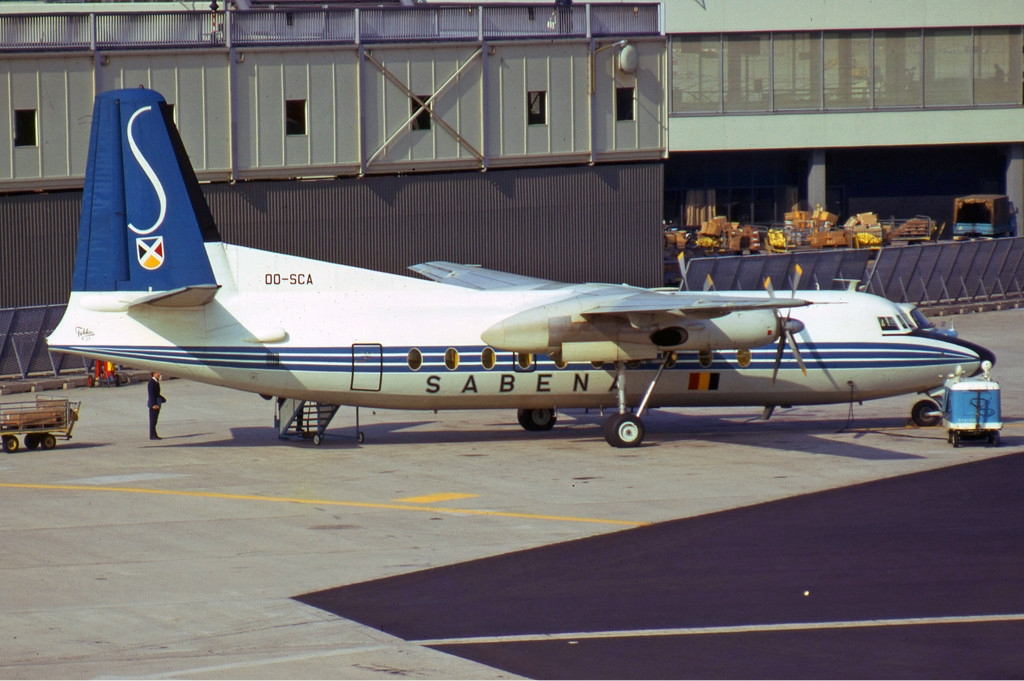
Fokker F-27s operated short-haul routes

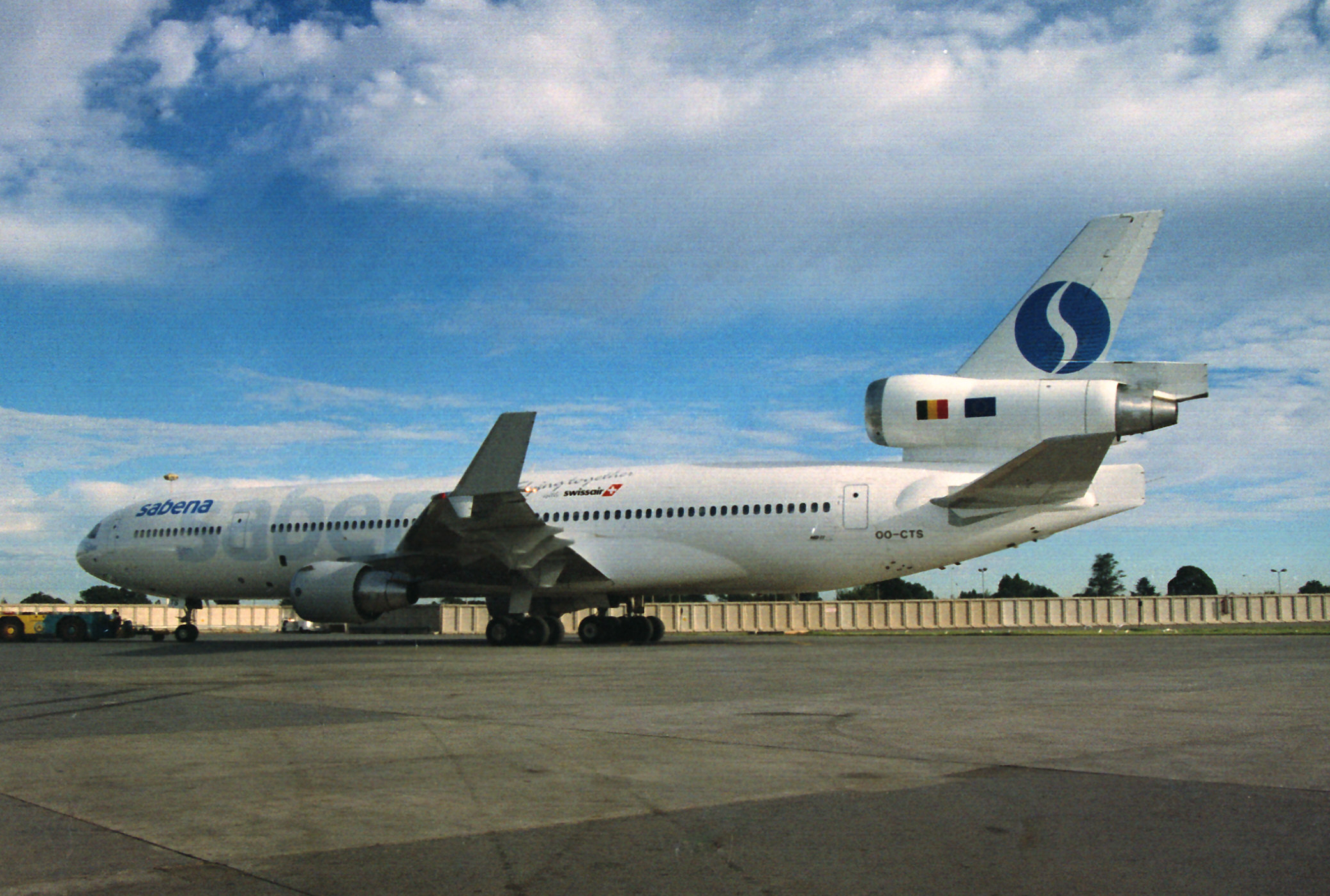
MD11

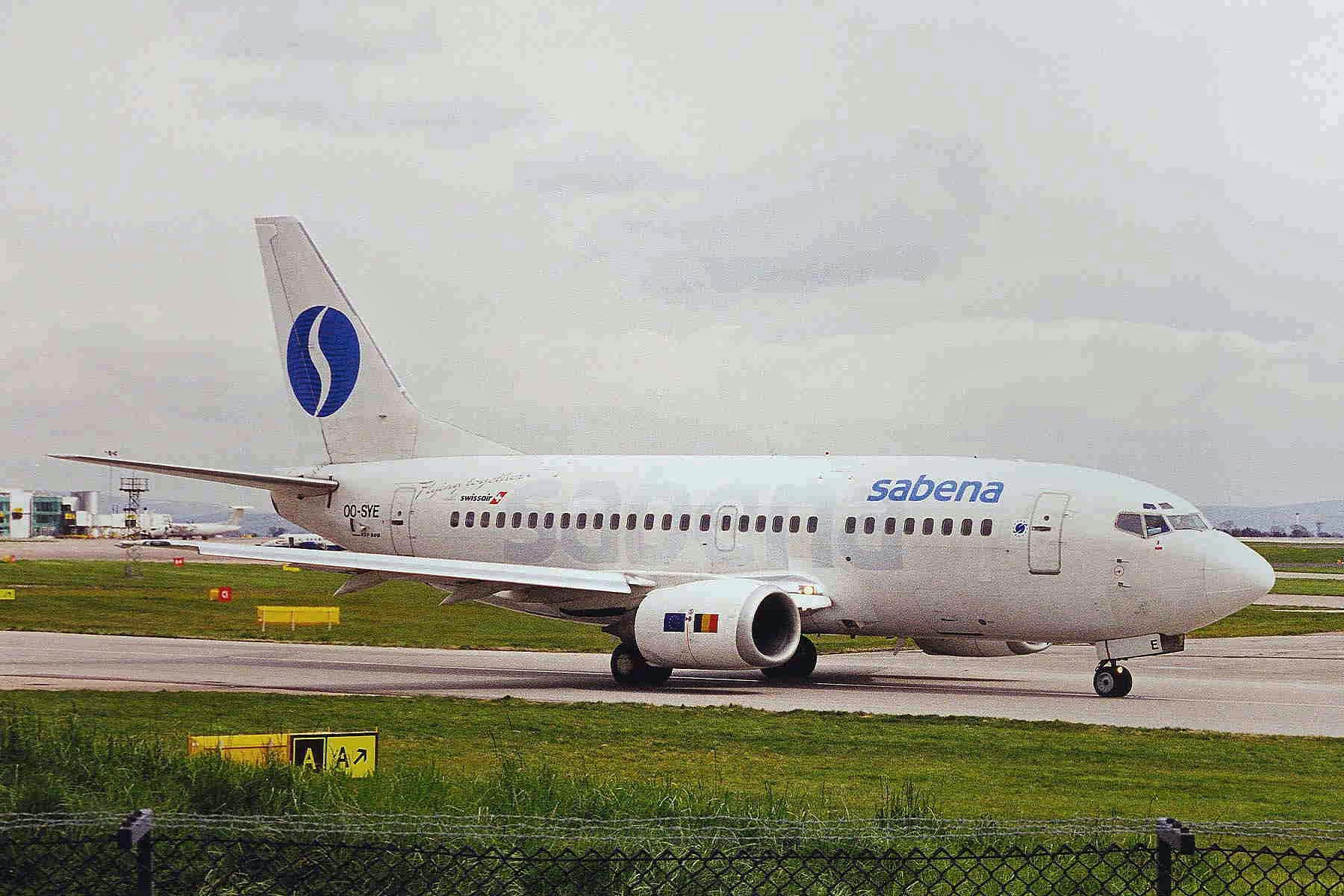
Boeing 737-500

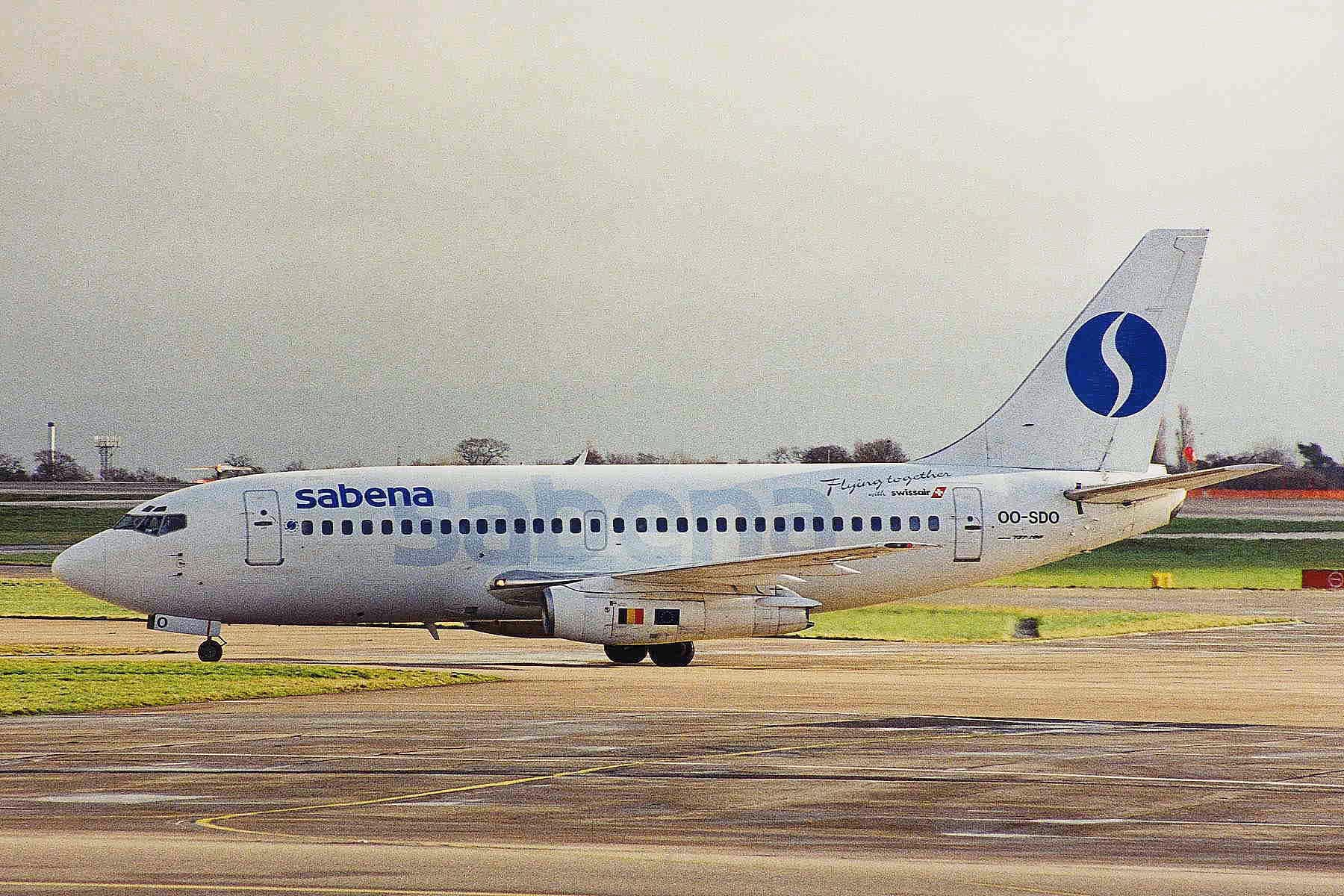
Boeing 737-200

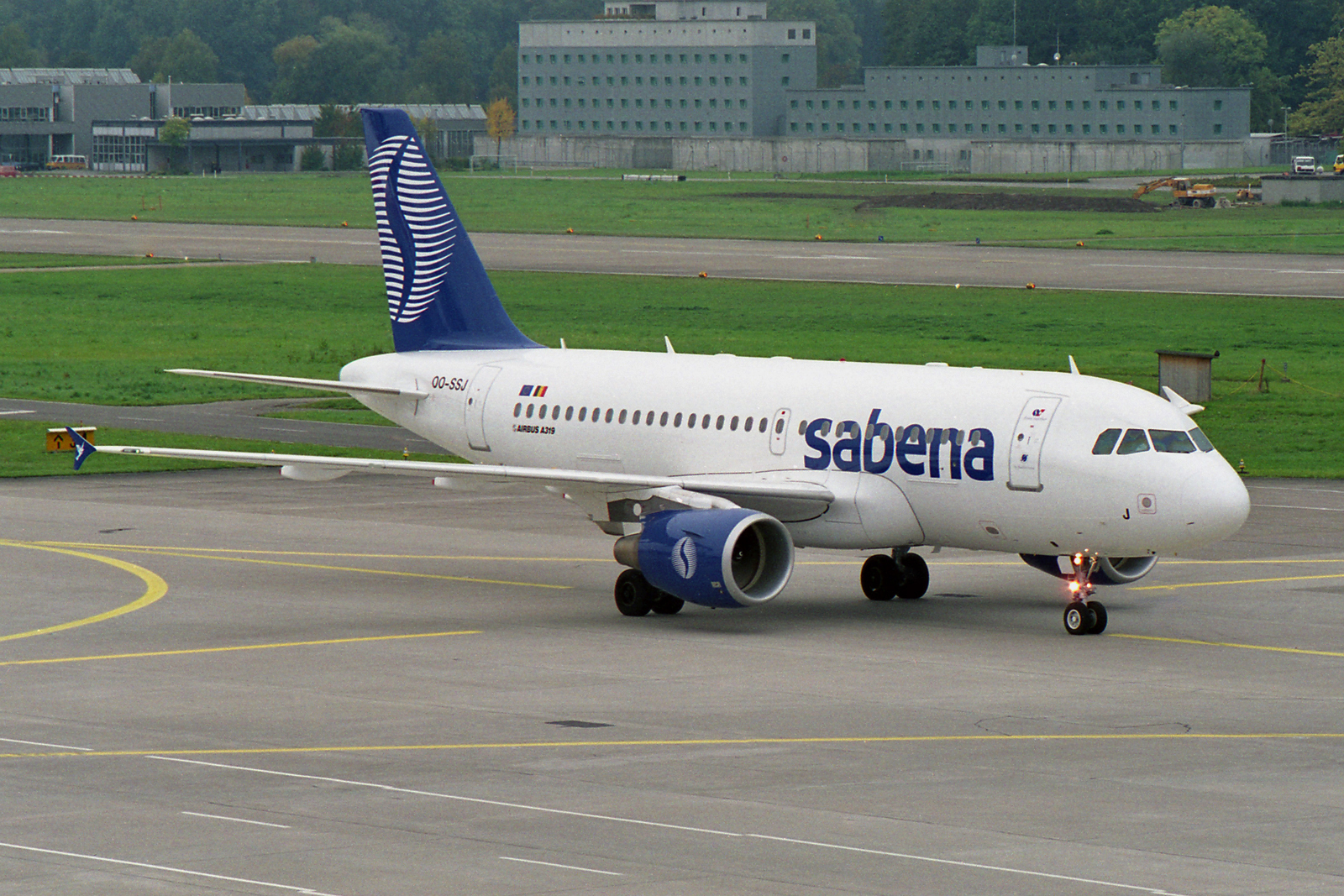
Airbus A319

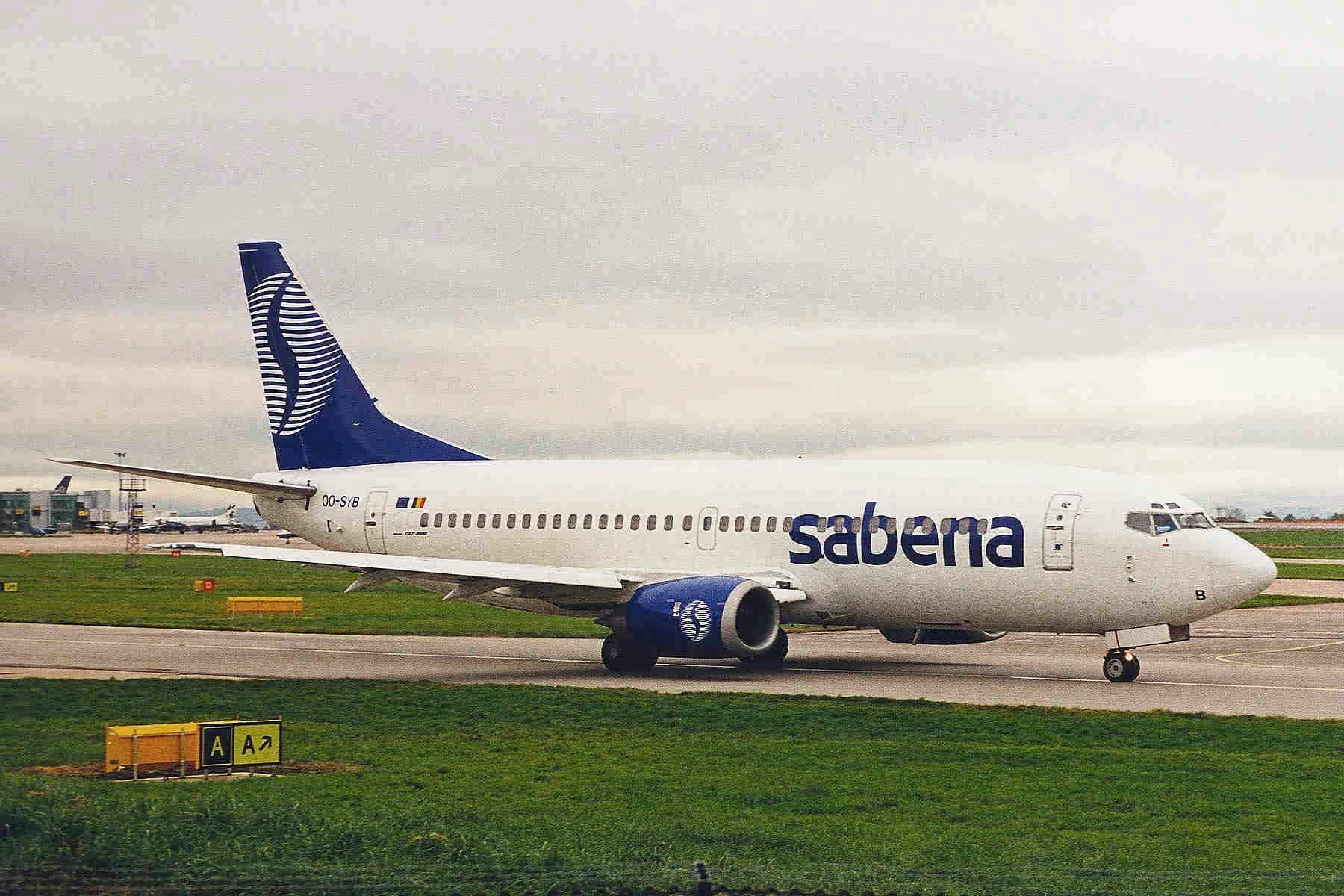
Boeing 737-300

Sabena historical fleet
Aircraft	Total	Introduced	Retired	Notes
Aérospatiale Alouette III	1	1957	1968	
Airbus A310-200	3	1984	1997	
Airbus A310-300	3	1987	1997	
Ansaldo A.300	1	1923	1925	
Airco DH.4	2	1923	1926	
Antonov An-12V	1	Unknown	Unknown	Leased from Balkan Bulgarian Airlines.
ATR 72-200	2	1999	2001	Leased from Schreiner Airways.
Auster Autocrat	1	1946	1970	
Avro Anson	1	1950	1953	
Avro RJ85	14	1995	2001	Operated by Delta Air Transport.
Avro RJ100	12	1997	2001	Operated by Delta Air Transport.
BAC One-Eleven Series 500	6	1995	1996	Leased from European Aviation Air Charter and British World Airlines.
Bell 47D-1	3	1950	1954	
Bell 47H	1	1957	1963	
Bréguet 19	1	1923	Unknown	
British Aerospace BAe-146-200	8	1990	2001	Operated by Delta Air Transport.
British Aerospace Jetstream 31	1	1996	1996	
Beechcraft 65	1	1968	1970	Operated by Delta Air Transport.
Beechcraft 99	2	1976	1986	Operated by Publi-Air.
Blériot-SPAD S.33	4	1923	1926	
Boeing 707-320	7	1959	1978	
Boeing 707-320C	10	1965	1996	
Boeing 707-420	1	1978	1978	Leased from Geminair
Boeing 727-100	6	1967	1978	
Boeing 727-200	1	1997	1997	
Boeing 737-200	16	1974	2001	
Boeing 737-400	3	1991	2001	
Boeing 747-100	1	1978	1978	Leased from Air France.
Boeing 747-100	1	1992	1992	Leased from Air France.
Boeing 747-100SCD	2	1970	1990	
Boeing 747-200M	2	1993	1996	Leased from Air France.
Boeing 747-300	3	1986	1999	
Bristol Freighter	3	1957	1966	Leased from Air Charter Limited.
Britten-Norman BN-2 Islander	2	1971	1975	Operated by Publi-Air.
Cessna 172M	1	1990	2001	
Cessna 310	11	1957	1982	
Convair CV-240	7	1949	1957	
Convair CV-440	12	1956	1968	
de Havilland DH.9	4	1923	1931	
de Havilland DH.50	2	1923	1927	
de Havilland DH.82 Tiger Moth	2	1954	1971	
de Havilland DH.89 Dragon Rapide	1	1949	1950	
de Havilland DH.104 Dove	7	1947	1957	
de Havilland DH.114 Heron	1	1967	1968	Operated by Belgian International Air Services.
de Havilland Canada DHC-6 Twin Otter	1	1973	1981	Operated by Publi-Air
De Havilland Canada Dash 8-100	1	2000	2001	Leased from Schreiner Airways.
De Havilland Canada Dash 8-300	12	1990	2001	Operated by Delta Air Transport.
Douglas C-47 Skytrain	35	1946	1969	
Douglas C-54 Skymaster	3	1947	1961	
Douglas DC-3	12	1946	1969	
Douglas DC-4	13	1947	1964	
Douglas DC-6	20	1947	1971	
Douglas DC-7C	9	1956	1964	
Embraer EMB 120 Brasilia	2	1994	Unknown	Operated by Delta Air Transport.
Embraer EMB 121 Xingu	5	1991	2001	Operated by Belgian Flying School.
Farman F.60 Goliath	4	1923	1929	
Fairchild FH-227B	3	Unknown	Unknown	Operated by Delta Air Transport.
Fairchild Swearingen Metroliner	3	1976	1989	Operated by European Air Transport.
Fairchild Swearingen Metroliner	1	1987	1987	Operated by Publi-Air.
Fokker F.II	2	1927	1937	
Fokker F.VII	28	1929	1946	
Fokker F-27 Friendship	3	1969	1990	
Fokker F-28 Fellowship	11	1993	1996	Operated by Delta Air Transport.
Fokker 50	1	1990	1991	Leased from Maersk Air.
Göppingen Gö 4	1	1956	1957	
Handley Page W.8F	15	1924	1935	
Junkers F 13	3	1923	1929	
Junkers Ju 52	9	1936	1946	
Lockheed Model 14 Super Electra	2	1942	1947	
Lockheed Model 18 Lodestar	7	1941	1949	
Lockheed L-1049 Super Constellation	3	1958	1958	Leased from Seaboard World Airlines.
MBB/Kawasaki BK 117	1	1989	1989	
McDonnell Douglas DC-10-30	6	1979	1997	
McDonnell Douglas DC-10-30CF	6	1974	1994	
Piper L-4 Grasshopper	2	1954	1963	
Piper PA-32 Cherokee Six	1	Unknown	Unknown	
Piper PA-34 Seneca	1	Unknown	Unknown	
Rumpler C.IV	4	1923	1929	
Saab 91 Safir	2	1953	1957	
SABCA S.2	1	1926	1933	
Savoia-Marchetti SM.73	12	1935	1940	
Savoia-Marchetti SM.83	4	1938	1940	
Scheibe Spatz	1	1954	1965	
Schleicher Ka 2 Rhönschwalbe	1	1956	1957	
SIAI-Marchetti SF.260	4	1970	1991	
Sikorsky S-55	6	1953	1957	
Sikorsky S-58	10	1956	1967	
Sikorsky S-62	1	1960	1961	
Sud Aviation Caravelle	12	1961	1977	
Vertol 44	2	1958	1958	Leased from Vertol Aircraft Corporation
Westland IV	4	1930	1935	

== Accidents and incidents ==
- 7 December 1934: At least two SABENA aircraft were destroyed in a hangar fire at Haren Airport as a result of a crash of a military Fairey Fox biplane.

=== Flights to or from Europe ===
- 11 September 1930: A SABCA F7b/3m (OO-AIN) lost control and crashed shortly after takeoff from Croydon Airport following an unexplained in-flight fire, killing both pilots.
- 10 December 1935: A Savoia-Marchetti S.73 (registered OO-AGN) crashed at Tatsfield, Surrey, United Kingdom, with the loss of 11 lives.
- 4 January 1937: Max Wenner disappeared from a Savoia Marchetti S.73 (registration OO-AGP) over Belgium; the plane itself was dismantled and hauled away by the Germans shortly after the invasion of Belgium in 1940.
- 16 November 1937: A Junkers Ju 52/3m (registered OO-AUB) crashed near Ostend, Belgium, while landing, killing all 12 people on board.
- 10 October 1938: A Savoia-Marchetti S.73 (OO-AGT) broke up in mid-air over Soest, Germany, en route to Berlin from Düsseldorf, killing all 20 on board.
- 14 March 1939: A Junkers Ju 52/3mge (OO-AUA) crashed in a field at Sint-Stevens-Woluwe due to pilot error, killing the three crew. The aircraft was operating a cargo (mail) flight from London to Brussels.
- 17 September 1946: A Douglas DC-3 (registered OO-AUR) crashed upon takeoff from Haren Airport, killing one crew member. The other two crew and four passengers on board the flight bound for Croydon Airport survived. The aircraft had lost airspeed on takeoff for unknown reasons.

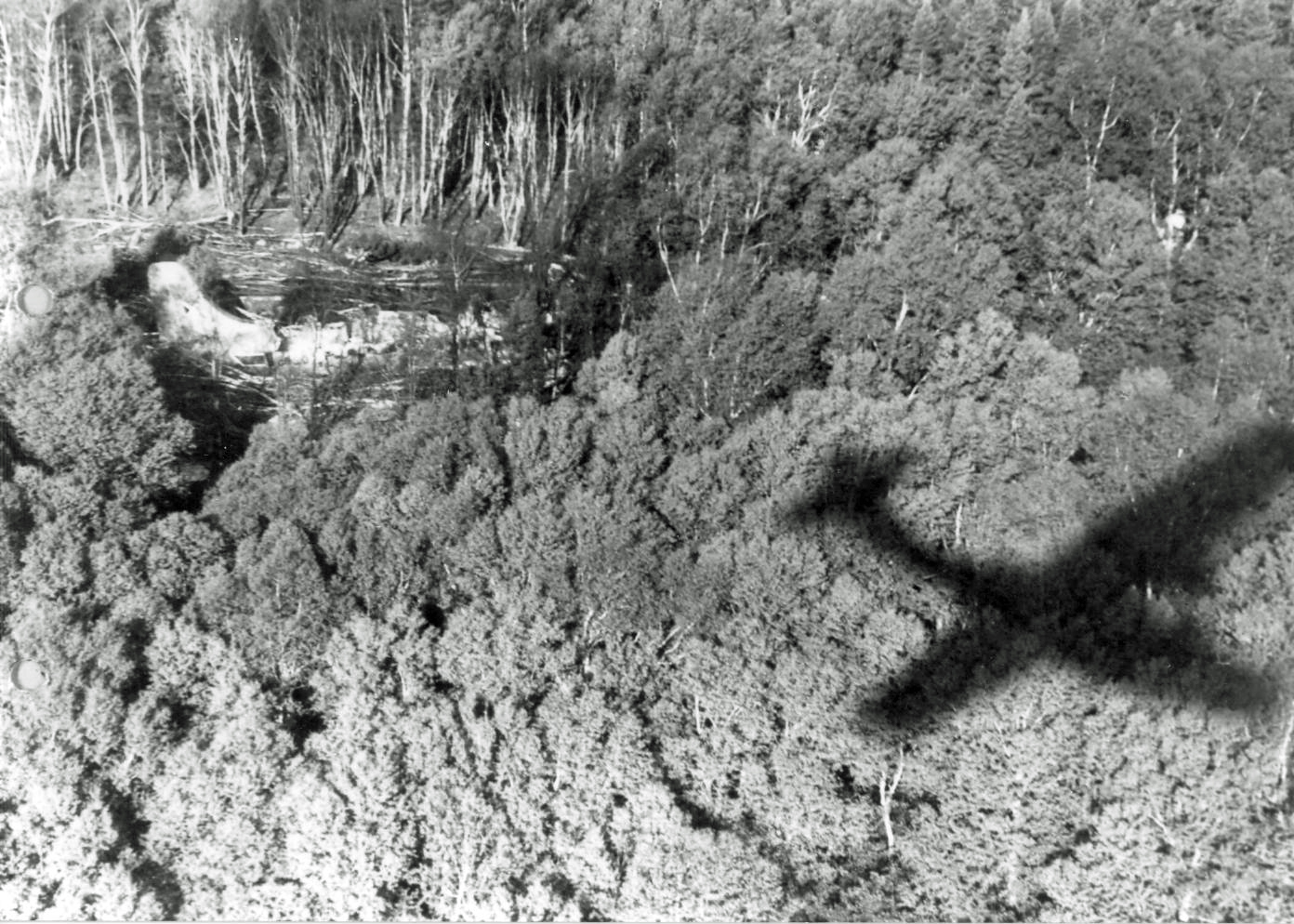
The crash site of the DC-4 in Newfoundland

- 18 September 1946: 27 people died when a SABENA Douglas DC-4 (OO-CBG) crashes 35 km short of Gander, Newfoundland, where the aircraft planned to land for a refueling stop on the flight from Brussels to New York. At the time of the accident, there was dense fog near the airport, and the pilot executed a flawed approach at too low an altitude. There were 17 survivors (16 passengers and one crew). The dead remain buried on location beside the remains of the wreck of the aircraft.
- 2 March 1948: The 19 passengers and three crew members on a flight from Brussels to London died when a Douglas DC-3 registered OO-AWH crashed on approach to London Heathrow Airport in low visibility conditions.
- 18 December 1949: A Douglas DC-3 (registered OO-AUQ) crashed near Aulnay-sous-Bois, France, killing the four passengers and four crew on board. The aircraft had just left Le Bourget Airport for a flight to Brussels when a wing separated.
- 14 October 1953: A Convair CV-240 (registered OO-AWQ) crashed near Kelsterbach, West Germany, killing the 40 passengers and four crew aboard the flight from Frankfurt to Brussels. Engine power was lost upon takeoff from Frankfurt Airport, making the aircraft impossible to control. The accident remains the deadliest involving the Convair 240.
- 19 December 1953: One passenger on board a flight from Brussels to Zürich was killed when the aircraft (a CV-240 registered OO-AWO) hit the ground 2.5 km short of the runway threshold of Kloten Airport. In low visibility conditions, the pilot descended below the glidepath. The other 39 passengers and three crew members survived the accident.
- 3 June 1954: A Douglas DC-3 (registered OO-CBY) was attacked by a Mikoyan-Gurevich MiG-15 fighter aircraft near Maribor, Yugoslavia. The aircraft, on a cargo flight from Blackbushe Airport to Belgrade, remained airborne, and a forced landing at Graz Airport was carried out, during which it ran off the runway. In the incident, one out of the four people on board was killed.
- 13 February 1955: The pilots of Flight 503 from Brussels to Rome lost orientation when approaching Ciampino Airport, resulting in the Douglas DC-6 registered OO-SDB crashing into the slope of Monte Terminillo, killing the 21 passengers and eight crew on board.
- 15 February 1961: The crash of Flight 548 with its 73 casualties marked the worst accident in the history of SABENA. The aircraft, a Boeing 707 registered OO-SJB, crashed at Brussels Airport at the end of a flight from New York City. Among the dead was the entire American delegation to the 1961 World Figure Skating Championships slated to be held in Prague; the competition was canceled in the aftermath.
- 13 July 1968: Flight 712, a cargo-configured 707 (registered OO-SJK), crashed upon approach to Lagos Airport in Nigeria on a flight from Brussels, killing the seven occupants. It was determined that the aircraft descended too low and struck trees.
- 9 May 1970: A Douglas DC-3 (registered OO-AUX) was damaged beyond repair in a ground accident at Amsterdam Airport Schiphol. The pilots began to taxi the aircraft even though they had not been cleared to do so, which resulted in the right propeller hitting an obstacle on the ground and debris destroying the airliner beyond economic repair. The aircraft had been leased from Delta Air Transport.
- 8 May 1972: Flight 571 from Vienna to Tel Aviv with 101 people on board (a Boeing 707 registered OO-SJG) was hijacked by four members of the terrorist organization Black September to secure the release of 315 detainees from Israeli prisons. At Ben Gurion Airport, two hijackers were shot and killed by the Israeli Sayeret Matkal special forces. One passenger died later of the wounds she had suffered in the shootout.

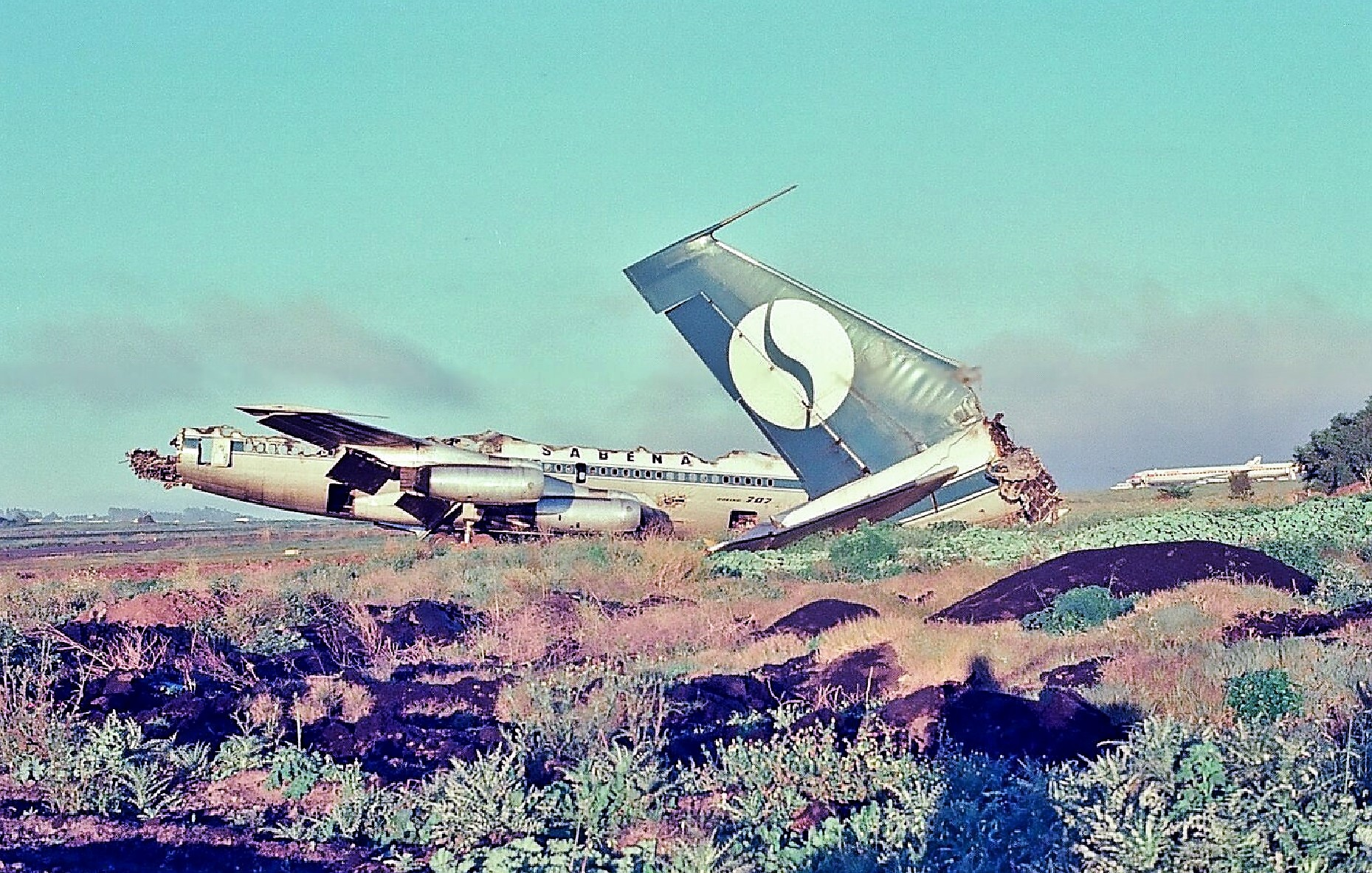
The wreck of the Boeing 707 OO-SJE at Tenerife North Airport

- 15 February 1978: A Boeing 707 (registered OO-SJE) undershot the runway at Los Rodeos Airport, causing the nose gear to collapse, at the end of a chartered holiday flight from Brussels with 189 passengers and seven crew on board. All passengers and crew were evacuated safely, but the spilled fuel caught fire, destroying the aircraft.
- 4 April 1978: A Boeing 737-200 (registered OO-SDH) on a training flight suffered a bird strike during a practice landing at Charleroi Airport. The pilot instructor attempted to get the aircraft airborne again but failed because of insufficient remaining runway. The aircraft was damaged beyond repair.
- 29 August 1998: Flight 542 from New York to Brussels with 248 passengers and 11 crew members on board, an Airbus A340-200 (registered OO-SCW), suffered a broken right landing gear upon landing at Brussels Airport. The aircraft veered off the runway. There were no notable injuries in the ensuing evacuation, and the aircraft was repaired. Main gear metal fatigue was blamed for the incident.
- 13 October 2000: Flight 689 from Brussels to Abidjan was hijacked by a Nigerian national who was due to be deported. The Airbus A330-200 with 146 other passengers and 11 crew members on board was forced to land at Málaga Airport in Spain, where the perpetrator was overpowered by local police forces.
- 4 December 2000: Flight 877 from Brussels to Nairobi, Kenya, via Bujumbura, Burundi, was struck by machine gun fire as it approached Bujumbura. Bullets had injured a passenger and cabin crew member. One engine also suffered damage. The Airbus A330-200 registered OO-SFR, carrying 170 passengers and crew, was struck in an attack blamed by the government on Hutu rebels, who denied responsibility. The aircraft landed safely but did not continue the flight. The aircraft was repaired and returned to service.

=== Flights in the Belgian colonies ===
- 26 January 1937: A SABCA S.73 (OO-AGR) crashed south of Oran-es Senia Airport, Algeria, during a round trip from Belgium to the Belgian Congo, killing all 12 on board. During the flight back to Belgium, the aircraft was approaching Oran for an en route stop. Witnesses noticed the aircraft flying at 1,000 m (3,300 ft) when it went into a sudden nosedive until it crashed. The cause was not determined, but bad weather and engine problems were ruled out. Several recommendations were issued in the wake of the accident: the center of gravity and baggage requirements are checked to ensure proper load distribution; adequate maintenance and inspection personnel are available in the Congo and ports of call; maximum hours of piloting are reviewed to avoid fatigue, as well as provide use of the autopilot;seat belts are required for pilots;all security measures are taken for crossing the Mediterranean; and more cockpit instruments are installed.
- 1 January 1943: A Junkers Ju 52 (registered OO-AUG) crashed 80 mi from Bangui in then French Equatorial Africa.
- 25 March 1944: A Junkers Ju 52/3mge (OO-AGU) crashed at Costermansville (now Bukavu), Belgian Congo.
- 3 April 1944: A Junkers Ju 52/3mge (OO-AUF) crashed nearby at Mongena.
- 14 December 1945: A Lockheed Model 18 Lodestar (registered OO-CAK) caught fire and was subsequently destroyed following a forced landing near Kouandé during a flight that had originated at Lagos, Nigeria.
- 7 January 1947: A Douglas DC-3 (registered OO-CBO) crashed near Costermansville.
- 24 December 1947: A Lockheed Lodestar (registered OO-CAR) experienced an engine failure shortly after takeoff from an airfield near Mitwaba, then French Congo, and subsequently crashed, killing the five occupants on board.
- 12 May 1948: A Douglas DC-4 (registered OO-CBE) crashed near Magazini after flying into a tornado at low altitude during a scheduled passenger flight from Léopoldville (now Kinshasa) to Libenge, then Belgian Congo, killing the 24 passengers and seven crew members; only one passenger survived.
- 31 August 1948: Another 13 people (ten passengers, three crew) were killed when their aircraft, a Douglas DC-3 (registered OO-UBL), crashed near Kimbwe en route to Elizabethville (now Lubumbashi) from Manono.
- 27 August 1949: A Douglas DC-3 (registered OO-CBK) experienced a loss of engine power shortly after takeoff from Leopoldville Airport for a flight to Elizabethville (now Lubumbashi), with 17 passengers and three crew on board. The three crew members and two out of the seventeen passengers on board died in the ensuing crash.
- 24 July 1951: The right engine of a cargo-configured Douglas DC-3 (registered OO-CBA) failed on takeoff from Gao Airfield and crashed, resulting in the loss of lives of the three persons on board. The engine failed due to hydraulic failure; hydraulic fluid squirted on the windshield, temporarily blinding the pilots, who then lost control of the aircraft.
- 4 February 1952: Flight 425, a C-47A (registered OO-CBA), crashed in the Dibata forest some 20 km (12 mi) from Kikwit en route from Costermansville to Léopoldville after a blade broke off the right side propeller and cut through the fuselage, severing control cables and resulting in a loss of control, killing all 16 on board. The propeller blade broke off following a shaft failure when the number two engine stopped suddenly after the piston lug on the No. 6 cylinder failed due to fatigue.
- 18 May 1958: A Douglas DC-7 (registered OO-SFA) suffered a problem with its leftmost engine whilst on a flight from Lisbon to Léopoldville with 56 passengers and nine crew members. The pilots prepared for an emergency landing at Casablanca–Anfa Airport, but shortly before touchdown, a go-around was attempted, which resulted in a stall because of the lesser available engine power. The aircraft crashed into buildings and caught fire, from which only four passengers could be saved alive.

== See also ==
- Sabena technics
