= Sabena Flight 877 =

2000 aviation incident in Burundi

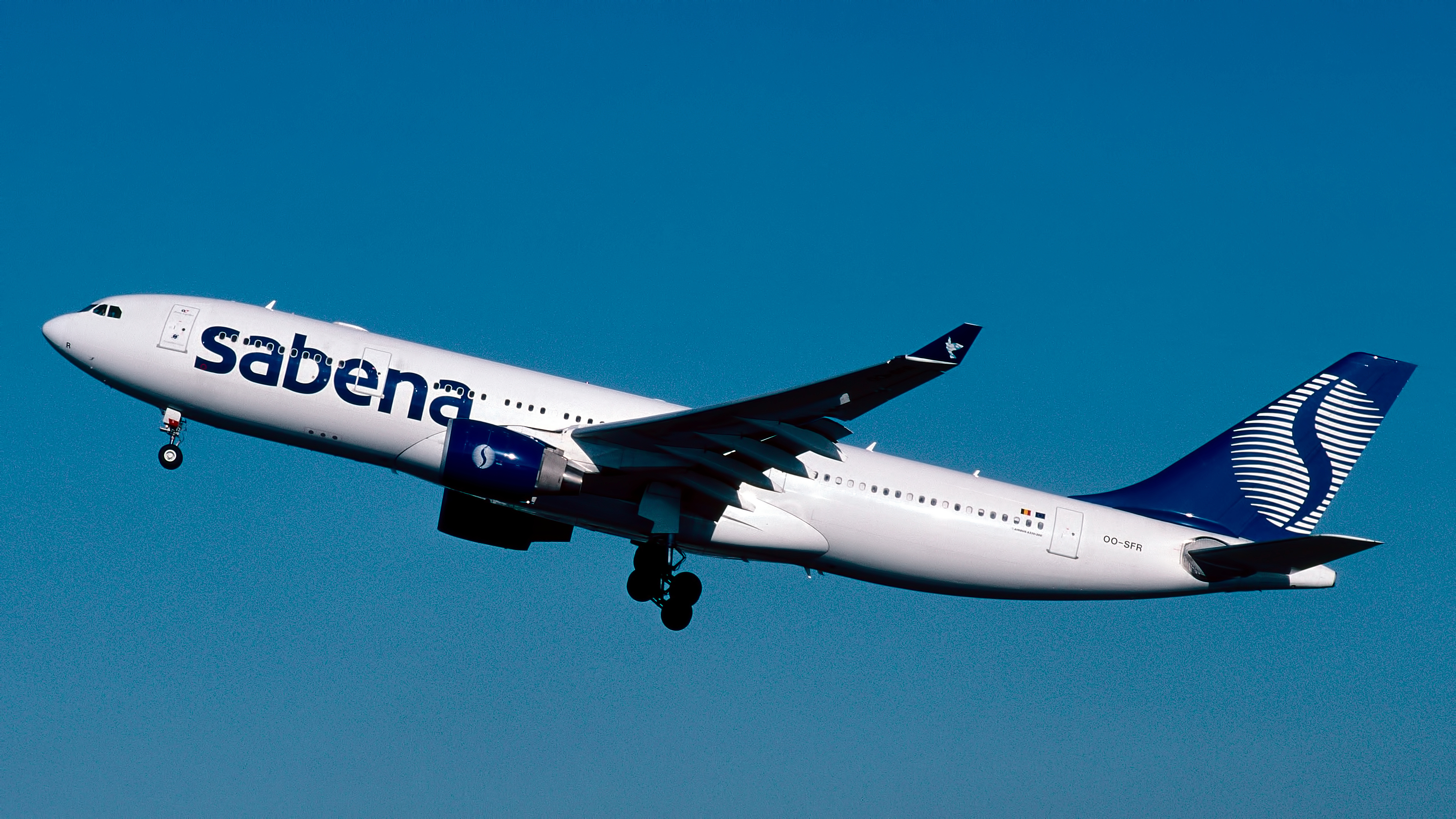
- OO-SFR, the aircraft involved in the incident

Incident
- Date: 4 December 2000
- Summary: Damaged by gunfire from Hutu rebels during landing
- Site: Bujumbura International Airport, Bujumbura, Burundi

Aircraft
- Aircraft type: Airbus A330-223
- Operator: Sabena
- IATA flight No.: SN877
- ICAO flight No.: SAB877
- Call sign: SABENA 877
- Registration: OO-SFR
- Flight origin: Brussels Airport, Brussels, Belgium
- Stopover: Bujumbura International Airport, Bujumbura, Burundi
- Destination: Jomo Kenyatta International Airport, Nairobi, Kenya
- Occupants: 170
- Passengers: 158
- Crew: 12
- Fatalities: 0
- Injuries: 2
- Survivors: 170

Sabena Flight 877 was a scheduled passenger flight from Brussels Airport, Brussels, Belgium to Jomo Kenyatta International Airport in Nairobi, Kenya via Bujumbura International Airport in Bujumbura, Burundi. On 4 December 2000, Hutu rebels fired machine guns at the Airbus A330 operating the flight as it landed in Bujumbura, damaging the aircraft and injuring two of the 170 people on board. There were no fatalities.

== Incident ==
Flight 877 was cleared to land at Bujumbura at 17:23 local time. Out of the 158 passengers on board, 76 had Bujumbura as their final destination, while the remaining 76 would head to Nairobi.

The aircraft passed over Goma in the Democratic Republic of the Congo on approach to runway 17 at Bujumbura Airport, rather than landing on runway 35, which involves passing over Lake Tanganyika. This may have been done due to faulty runway lights or the fact that runway 17 is preferred for landing in Bujumbura due to surrounding terrain and ILS installation.

At 17:56, just 330 feet (100 m) from the runway, machine guns were fired at the aircraft, lasting 20 seconds, after which the aircraft landed. Two people were injured.

The aircraft's nose wheel hydraulics system had been damaged by the gunfire, resulting in difficulty in taxiing after landing.

== Investigation ==
Burundi's attorney general set up a commission to investigate the incident. The airport and its surrounding area were investigated. Airport employees, soldiers, as well as passengers and crew were interviewed.

Burundian authorities blamed the shooting on Hutu rebels who were dissatisfied with a peace agreement signed the previous month. The rebels believed that the aircraft was carrying weapons. Three people were prosecuted for their role in the incident, and another four were arrested.

On 21 December 2000, in accordance with aviation law, Belgian judicial police traveled to Bordeaux (where the aircraft was being repaired) to assess the damage to the aircraft.

== Aftermath ==
Sabena immediately suspended all flights to and from Burundi, and the route was later terminated with the airline's demise. Brussels Airlines resumed flights to Burundi seven years later. The passengers heading to Nairobi flew to their destination the next day on a Kenya Airways flight.

After temporary repairs, the aircraft was flown without passengers to Nairobi, carrying technicians from Sabena. The aircraft then flew to Bordeaux for permanent repairs. On 13 January 2001, the aircraft was flown to Brussels. The aircraft resumed commercial service on 16 January on a flight to Boston in the United States.
