= 1948 Heathrow disaster =

1948 aviation accident

Coordinates: 51°30′N 0°26′W

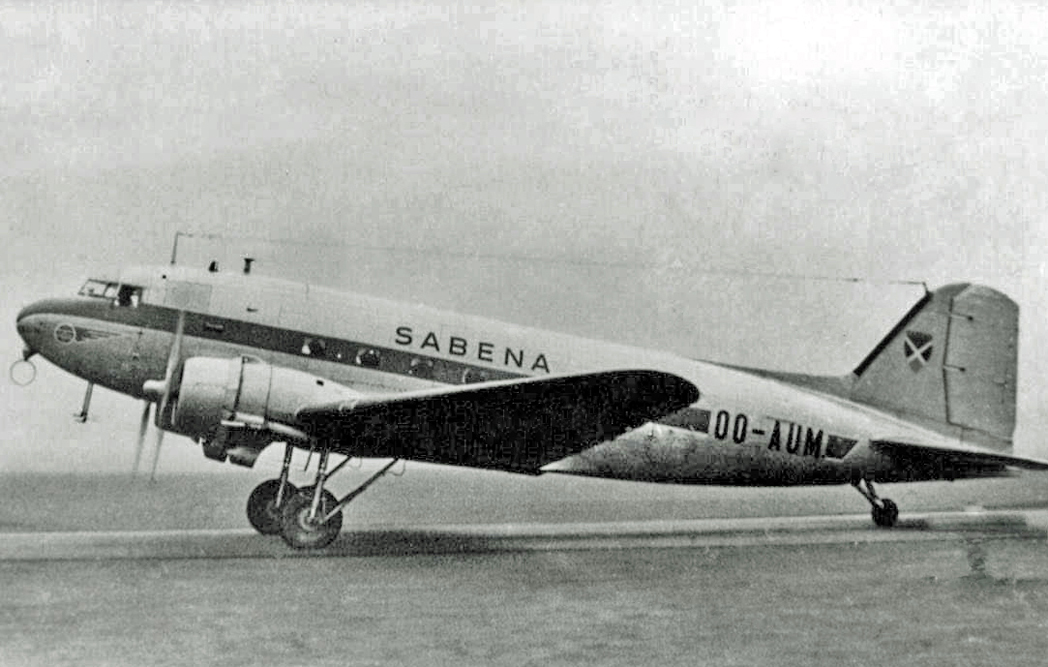
- A Sabena DC-3, similar to the accident aircraft

Accident
- Date: 2 March 1948
- Summary: Poor weather conditions and pilot error
- Site: Heathrow Airport

Aircraft
- Aircraft type: Douglas DC-3C
- Operator: Sabena
- Registration: OO-AWH
- Flight origin: Brussel-Zaventem airport (BRU/EBBR), Belgium
- Destination: London Airport (LHR/EGLL), United Kingdom
- Occupants: 22
- Passengers: 19
- Crew: 3
- Fatalities: 20
- Injuries: 2
- Survivors: 2

The 1948 Heathrow disaster was the crash of a Douglas DC-3C of the Belgian airline Sabena at Heathrow Airport, London, United Kingdom on 2 March 1948. It was the first major accident at Heathrow Airport; of the 22 people on board 20 were killed, of whom most had British nationality.

== Aircraft ==
The DC-3 involved was built in 1947 with serial number 43154 and registration OO-AWH and was used by the Belgian airline company Sabena from 21 March 1947 until its destruction in 1948. It was built for a US military contract but was never delivered and was the last DC-3 to be built by Douglas.

== Crash ==
The Sabena flight departed from Brussels, Belgium en route to London, United Kingdom under the command of pilot Henri Goblet and radio officer Jean Lomba.

Nationality	Passengers		Crew		Total	
Nationality	Total	Killed	Total	Killed	Total	Killed
Belgium	0	0	3	3	3	3
United Kingdom	13	12	0	0	13	12
Poland	2	1	0	0	2	1
United States	1	1	0	0	1	1
Italy	1	1	0	0	1	1
Switzerland	1	1	0	0	1	1
Cuba	1	1	0	0	1	1
Total	19	17	3	3	22	20

Workers in a hangar nearby saw the aircraft crash on the runway and quickly went to the survivors' aid. When they reached the aircraft, there was utter devastation; only the tail section of the aircraft was left intact. However, there were survivors and the workers quickly pulled a few passengers from the burning wreckage. They could hear the screams of those still trapped in the inferno and despite all their efforts those people perished. When emergency personnel finally arrived on the scene, there was no one left to save. It was later concluded that a high number of passengers survived the crash but died in the blaze either by burning to death or smoke inhalation. The three survivors were badly burned and were quickly taken to the hospital, where one of them soon died from his injuries. One of the survivors was former MP Otho Nicholson.

== Aftermath ==
Following the crash, the United Kingdom's Ministry of Civil Aviation stipulated that ground-controlled approaches would no longer be available to aircraft landing in conditions of less than 150 feet (46 m) vertical visibility and 800 yards (730 m) horizontal visibility except in an emergency. In the wake of the crash and that of a Douglas DC-4 two months later, Sabena postponed its 25th anniversary celebrations that had been scheduled for the end of May 1948. The two airport workers who entered the burning wreckage to rescue survivors, Harold Bending and Angus Brown, were awarded the George Medal in June 1948.
