= List of defunct airlines of Belgium =

This is a list of defunct airlines of Belgium.

Airline	Image	IATA	ICAO	Callsign	Commenced operations	Ceased operations	Notes
A
Abelag Airways					1979	1980	Renamed to Air Belgium. Operated Boeing 707
Abelag Aviation		W9	AAB	ABG	1983	2016	Renamed to Luxaviation Belgium
ACE Belgium Freighters		X7	FRH		2018	2020	Renamed to Challenge Airlines
Aerowings			AWG		2001	2002	Founded by Henri Fabri. Operated DC-10
Air Antwerp		WP	ATW	DEVIL	2019	2021	
Air Belgium (1979–2000)		AJ	ABB	VY	1979	2000	
Air Charter Express					2007	2009	Renamed to Meridian Airways. Ghana registered aircraft
Air Charter Service			ACH		1997	2002	
Air Congo CFL					1947	1949	
Air Meuse			AMZ	AIR MEUSE	1990	1997	Merged into Delta Air Transport
Air Transport AS					1946	1950	Operated Airspeed Consul, Lockheed Lodestar, Percival Proctor, Short Stirling
Air Union Belge					1946	1954	Operated Mráz Sokol, ERCO Ercoupe, Noorduyn Norseman, Piper Cub
Airlines 1992					1990	1992	Operated Fairchild Metro
Airventure BVBD			RVE	VENTURE LINER	2004	2006	Operated Embraer Xingu
Antwerp Air					1986	1986	Subsidiary of Hawa Air. Operated CASA C-212 Aviocar
Aviameer Airlines					1958	1960	Operated Vickers VC.1 Viking
B
Belgian Air Service					1949	1949	Operated Avro Anson
Belgian World Airlines			BWA		1998	1999	Founded by Luke Mellaerts. Operated Boeing 767-300
BelgiumExel			HXL		2004	2005	
BFS International		CQ	BFS	MOONRUN	1981	1995	Operated Boeing 757-200, Dassault Falcon 20
BIAS Belgian International Air Service			AP	ALPHA PAPA	1959	1972	Founded by Charles van Antwerpen and George Richardson. Renamed to BIAS International. Operated de Havilland Dove, de Havilland Heron, DC-3, DC-4, DC-6, DC-8, Fokker F27, Sud Aviation Caravelle
BIAS International					1972	1973	Established as BIAS. Rebranded as BIAS Overseas Operated Douglas DC-8, Sud Aviation Caravelle
BIAS Overseas		AP			1974	1976	Established as BIAS. Operated Douglas DC-8, Sud Aviation Caravelle
Birdy Airlines		4V	BDY	BEL-BIRD	2002	2004	Merged into SN Brussels Airlines
Brussels International Airlines		BX			2000	2001	Established as Red Air in 1999. Operated Airbus A321
C
Cargo B Airlines		BB	CBB	CARGO-BEE	2007	2009	
CAT Coastal Air Transport					1953	1960	Operated Avro Anson
Chartair					1993	1994	Operated Boeing 737-400
CityBird		H2	CTB	DREAMFLIGHT	1996	2001	Went bankrupt
COBETA Compagnie Belge de Transports Aeriens					1947	1950	Operated Douglas DC-3, Lockheed Hudson
Constellation Airlines		CQ	CIN	CONSTELLATION	1995	1999	Went bankrupt
D
DAT Belgian Regional Airline					1996	2001	Rebranded DAT Plus
DAT Delta Air Transport		QG	DAT	DELTAIR	1967	1996	Rebranded as DAT Belgian Regional Airline
DAT Plus					2001	2002	Rebranded SN Brussels Airlines
DAT Wallonie					1990	1991	Merged into Air Meuse. Operated Embraer Brasilia
Delsey Airlines		IV	FVG	NICO	2002	2002	Established as VG Airlines
Delta International					1973	1973	Operated Boeing 720
E
EAT European Air Transport		QY	BCS	EUROTRANS	1971	2010	Merged into European Air Transport Leipzig
EBA EuroBelgian Airlines		BQ			1991	1996	Rebranded as Virgin Express
EJI Eurojet International					1987	1992	To provide capacity in Europe for DHL Aviation
Euro Direct België					1994	1995	Established as Sky Freighters. Rebranded Euro Direct
European Airlift					1990	1994	Operated Boeing 707
European Airlines		2H	FRO	FROBISHER	1991	1995	Operated Airbus A300, Boeing 707
European Expedite					1989	1992	Operated Beech 99, Convair 580
F
First International Airlines					1997	2006	Operated Boeing 707
Flanders Airlines			FLN		1989	1992	Formed by the merger of Frevag Airlines and Servisair. Operated Fokker F27, Embraer Bandeirante, Fairchild Metro
Frevag Airlines					1989	1992	Merged with Servisair to form Flanders Airlines
H
Hawa Air					1959	1988	
I
* IFA International Freight Airways		FW	IFA		1977	1978	Operated Douglas DC-6
J
Jason Air					1996	1997	Operated Boeing 707-324C
Jetairfly		TB	JAF	BEAUTY	2005	2016	
John Mahieu Aviation					1948	1954	Operated Avro Anson, Beech D18S, de Havilland Dragon Rapide, de Havilland Dragonfly, C-47, Lockheed Hudson, Avro 504
L
Lamda Jet					1995	1995	Acquired by Abelag Aviation. Renamed to Luxaviation Belgium
Lignes Aeriennes Wallones					1980	1981	Regional services for Sabena. Operated Fairchild Metro II
M
Meridian Airways			MAG	MERID AIR	2009	2010	
O
ONA Overseas National Airways					1987	1990	Founded by Luc Mallaerts and Pierre Vandenbrouke. Operated Boeing 707
P
Pomair					1971	1974	Established as Transpommair in 1970. Operated Douglas DC-6, Douglas DC-8
S
Sabena		SN	SAB	SABENA	1923	2001	Was the Belgian national carrier until Brussels Airlines took over the role after Sabena's bankruptcy
Servisair					1986	1989	Founded by Yves Carpentier. Merged with Frevag Airlines to form Flanders Airlines
SETA Société d'Etude et de Transports Aériens					1946	1946	Charter division of Sabena. Rebranded as Sobelair. Operated Douglas DC-3
Sky Service		S3	SKS	SKY SERVICE	1983	2005	Merged with Abelag Aviation. Operated Beech King Air, Cessna Citation, Fokker F27, Embraer Bandeirante
Skyjet Belgium			SKT	GREENBIRD	1990	1998	Founded by Henri Fabri and Pierre Vandenbrouke. Rebranded Skyjet Europe. Operated Boeing 727, Douglas DC-8, DC-10
Skyjet Europe			SKS	SKY SERVICE	1998	2001	Established as Skyjet Belgium. Cargo carrier. Operated DC-10
SN Brussels Airlines		SN	DAT	S-TAIL	2002	2006	Merged with Virgin Express to form Brussels Airlines
SNETA					1919	1923	Renamed Sabena
Sobelair		Q7	SLR	SOBELAIR	1946	2004	
Sunrise					2002	2003	Rebranded TUI Airlines Belgium. Operated Boeing 737-400
T
TEA Trans European Airways		HE	TEA	BELGAIR	1971	1991	
Thomas Cook Airlines Belgium		HQ	TCW	THOMAS COOK	2002	2017	
TIA Transport International Aerien		TO	TRS		1982	1992	Operated Reims-Cessna F406 Caravan II
TNT Airways		3V	TAY	QUALITY	1999	2016	Merged into ASL Airlines Belgium
Trans-Air					1946	1947	Acquired by Air Transport AS. Operated Handley Page Halifax, Short Stirling
Transjet		LU			1981	1983	Livestock carrier. Operated Boeing 727-100C
Tubel Air					1993	1994	Founded by Jacques Bruynooghe. Operated Ilyushin Il-76
TUI Airlines Belgium		TB	TUB		2003	2005	Rebranded as Jetairfly. Operated Boeing 737-400
U
Unijet (Belgium)					1978	1981	Renamed to BFS International
V
VG Airlines		IV	FVG	NICO	2002	2002	Later became Delsey Airlines
Virgin Express		TV	VEX	VIRGIN EXPRESS	1996	2006	Merged with SN Brussels Airlines to form Brussels Airlines
VLM Airlines		VG	VLM	RUBENS	1993	2018	
VLM Airlines (Antwerp)					2017	2018	Founded by Freddy Van Gaever. Operated Airbus A320-200, Fokker 50
Y

== See also ==
- List of airlines of Belgium
- List of airports in Belgium
