= European Air Transport (Belgium) =

Cargo airline of Belgium (1971–2010)

European Air Transport N.V./S.A.

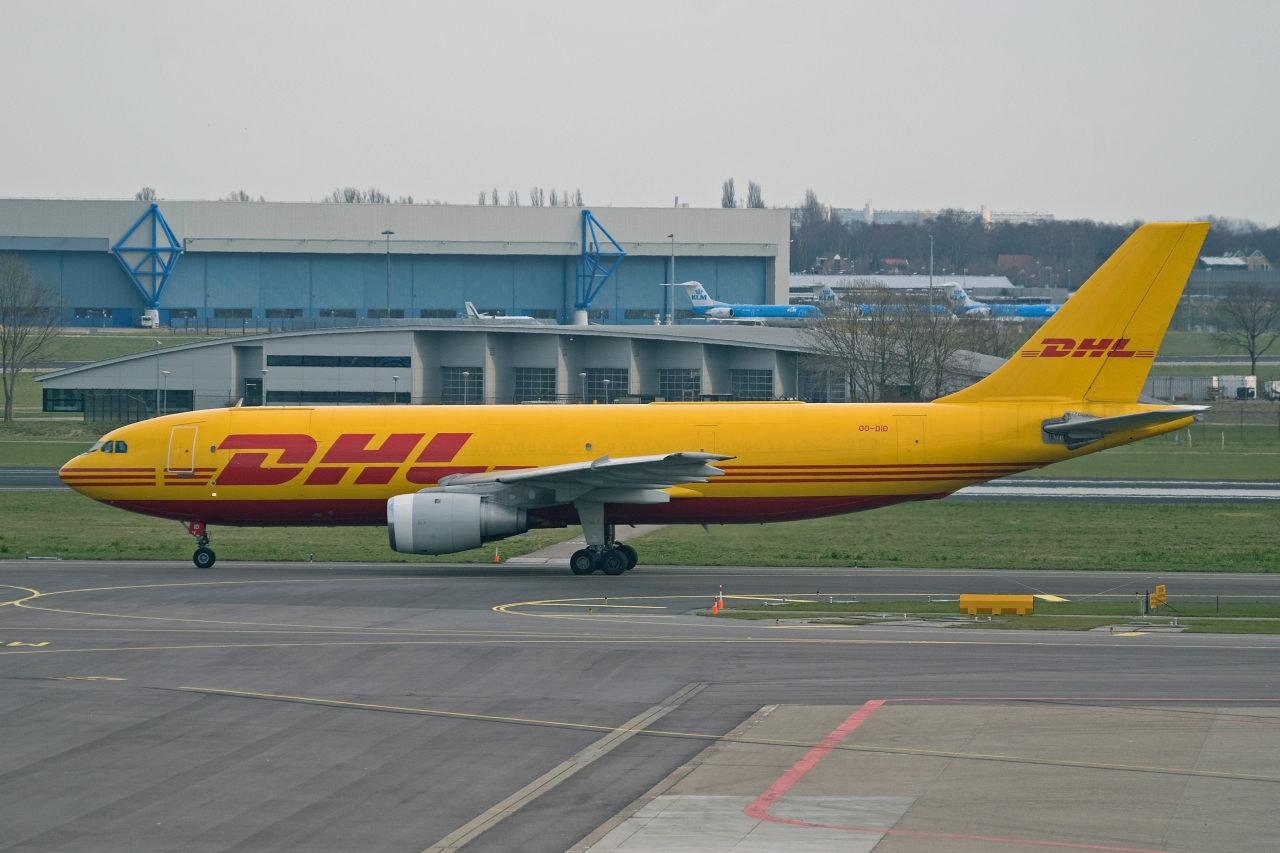
- Airbus A300-600RF
IATA	ICAO	Call sign
QY	BCS	POSTMAN
- Founded: 1971
- Commenced operations: April 1972
- Ceased operations: 26 March 2010 (merged into EAT Leipzig)
- Hubs: Leipzig/Halle Airport
- Fleet size: 16
- Destinations: Europe, Middle East and Africa
- Parent company: DHL
- Headquarters: Brussels Airport, Zaventem, Belgium
- Website: www.dhl.com

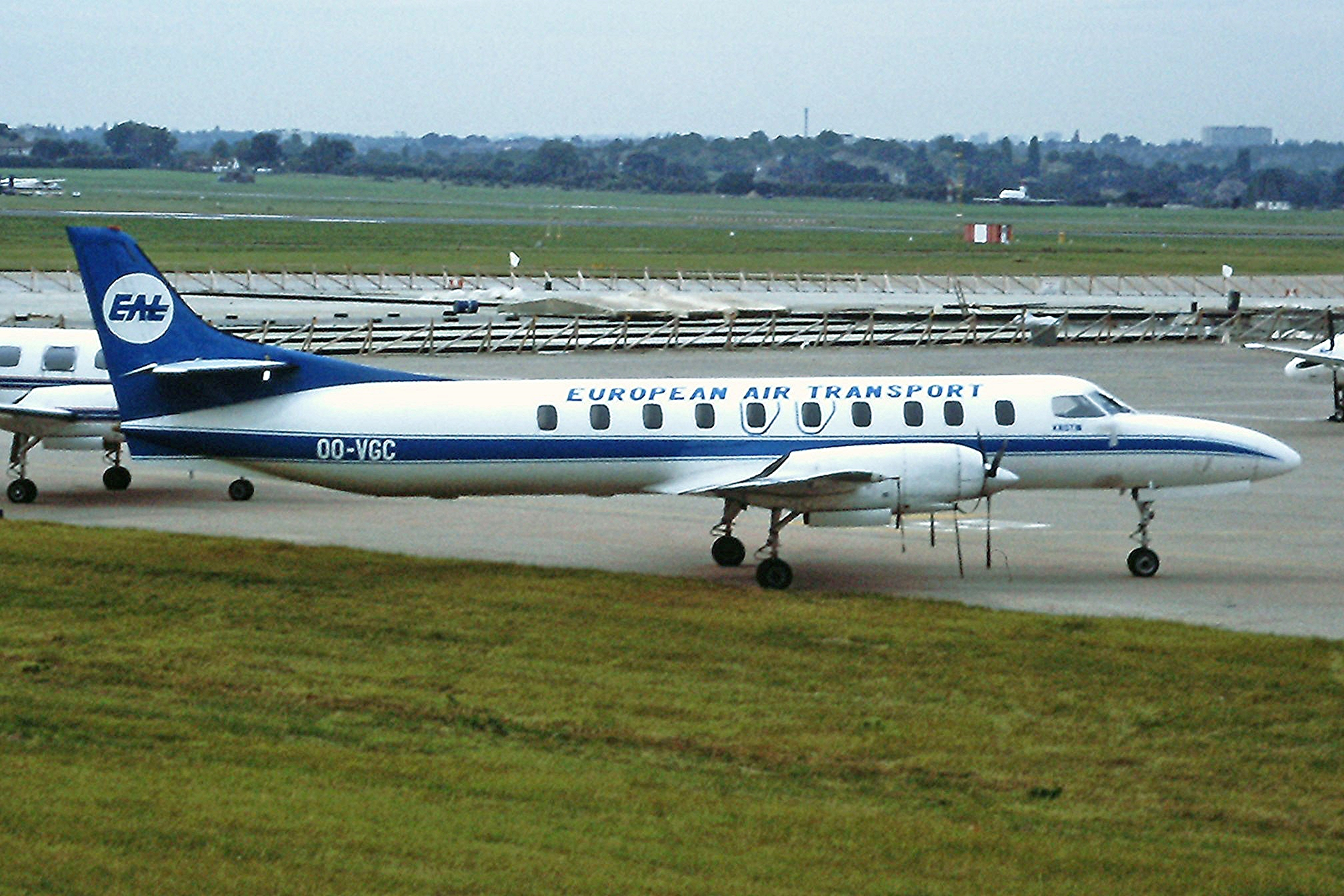
Fairchild Metroliner III

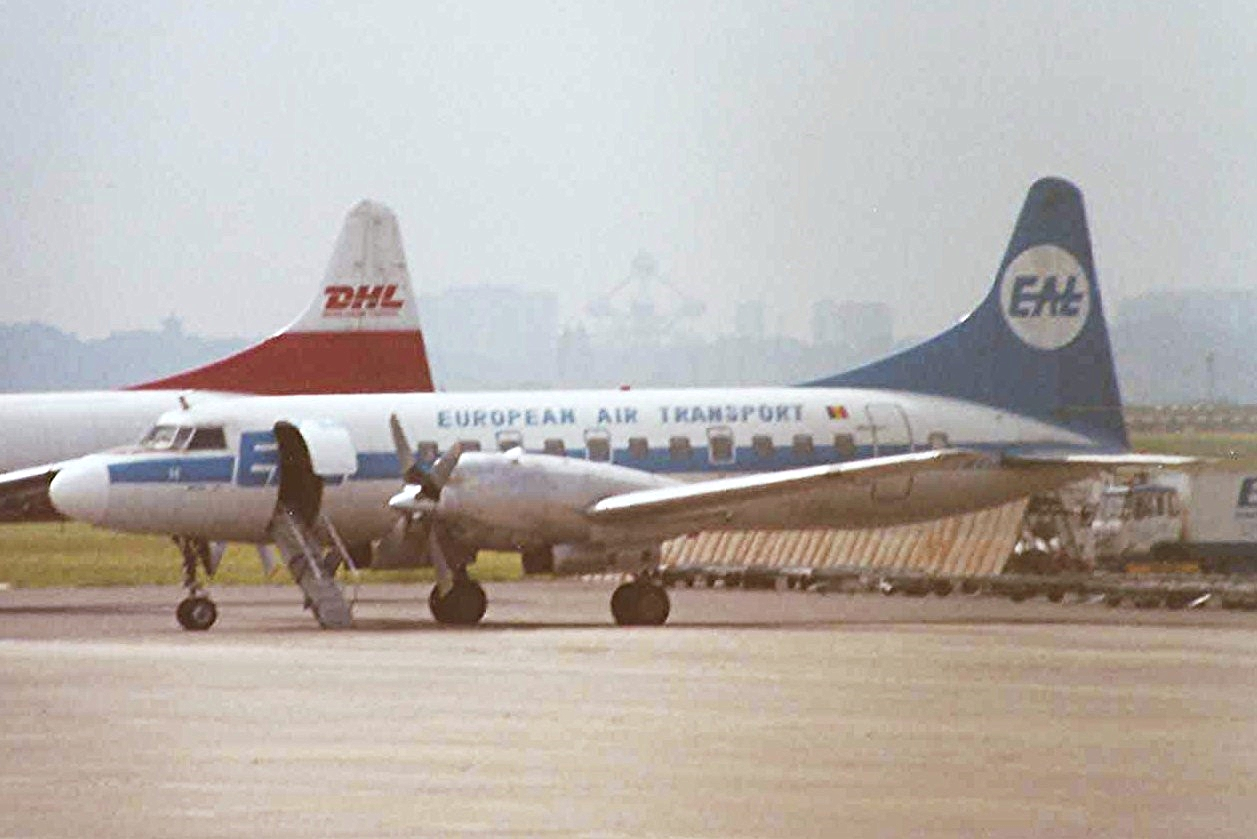
Convair CV-580

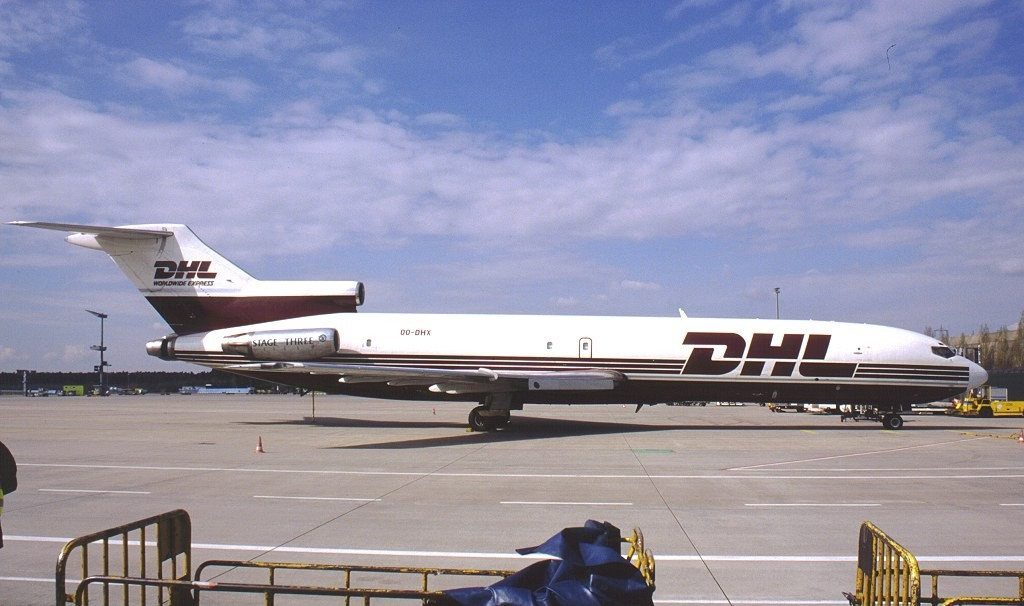
Boeing 727-200F

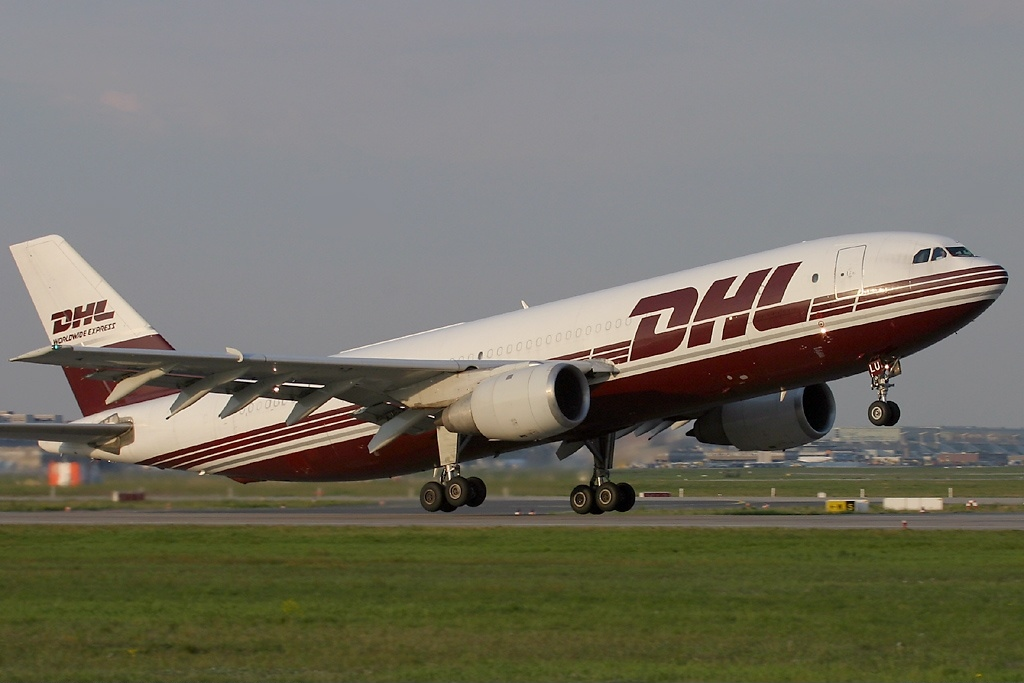
Airbus A300B4F in old colours taking off from Frankfurt Airport

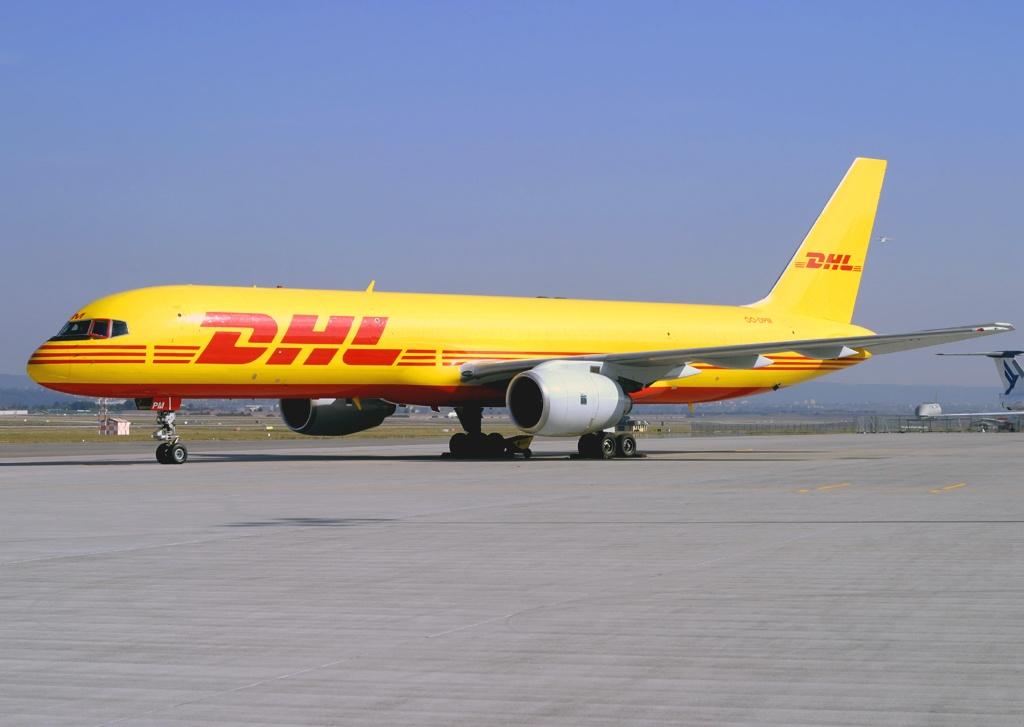
A Boeing 757-200SF at Stuttgart Airport

European Air Transport N.V. (EAT in short) was a cargo airline based in Brussels Airport and headquartered in Zaventem, Belgium, founded in 1971 and dissolved in 2010. It expanded by contracting with DHL Worldwide Express in 1985, became a member of the DHL Group a year later, operating the DHL-branded parcel and express services in Europe. It became a part of the International Air Transport Association (IATA) in 1993. After 2002 the airline was owned by Deutsche Post after the takeover of DHL. In February 2010, EAT was dissolved and its operations merged into European Air Transport Leipzig.

== History ==
European Air Transport was founded in Belgium in December 1971 as an air taxi company by two pilots, Pirlot de Corbion and Dessain. EAT started operations in April 1972 with two aircraft, a Beechcraft Queen Air and a Gardan Horizon. In response to the need for pilots in the Belgian market, EAT established a training school. In 1973, EAT was the first Piper Flying Centre in Europe. A few years later EAT was approached by Sabena and started flying regional routes on their behalf in 1976 with Fairchild Metroliner III regional aircraft. These activities lasted until Summer 1987. Later on also Convair CV-580 were used

In 1985, EAT expanded its activities by contracting with DHL Worldwide Express. Previously, DHL had selected Brussels Airport as its European hub. The co-operation between EAT and DHL was so successful that in 1986, DHL decided to make EAT part of the DHL Group, and thus it became the major DHL airline with services to Europe and Africa. On January 19, 1993, EAT became a member of the International Air Transport Association. In that same year, the airline obtained the necessary permits to transport various dangerous goods and live animals. In those years were mainly used Boeing 727-100F, Boeing 727-200F and later Boeing 757-200PF.

In 2002, Deutsche Post completed the takeover of DHL, making EAT a wholly owned subsidiary. In October 2004, Deutsche Post announced that from 2008 Brussels Airport would no longer be DHL's major hub for Europe. This was due to the failure of the Belgian Federal Government and Deutsche Post to reach an agreement on a framework that would permit DHL to expand its future flight operations at Brussels airport. Instead, Deutsche Post decided to transform Leipzig/Halle Airport in Germany in its international hub. EAT's headquarters were re-located in Schkeuditz, with daily flights to all major cities in Europe. EAT obtained a license for scheduled and unscheduled cargo flights all over the world. Through a merger agreement dated February 10, 2010, European Air Transport N.V. was dissolved, and its assets incorporated by European Air Transport Leipzig GmbH. The agreement came into force on March 26, 2010.

== Fleet ==
European Air Transport had formerly operated the following aircraft:

European Air Transport fleet
Aircraft	Total	Introduced	Retired	Notes
Airbus A300B4F	19	1998	2010	
Airbus A300-600RF	1	2003	2005	Leased from Islandsflug
Boeing 727-100F	6	1990	2003	
Boeing 727-200F	14	1994	2004	
Boeing 737-300QC	1	1996	1997	Leased from Air Belgium
Boeing 737-300QC	1	1999	1999	Leased from Air Belgium
Boeing 757-200PF	2	2000	2010	
Boeing 757-200SF	14	2000	2010	
CASA C-212 Aviocar	1	1986	1991	
Convair CV-580	13	1987	2000	
Fairchild Metroliner III	13	1976	1994	

== Accidents and incidents ==
- On 22 November 2003, an Airbus A300B4-200F (registered as OO-DLL) was struck on the left wing tip by a surface-to-air missile shortly after takeoff from Baghdad, Iraq. The damage resulted in a fire and complete loss of hydraulic flight control systems. The crew returned to Baghdad, there were no injuries.

== See also ==
- List of defunct airlines of Belgium
- 2003 Baghdad DHL attempted shootdown incident
