= CMA CGM Air Cargo =

French cargo airline

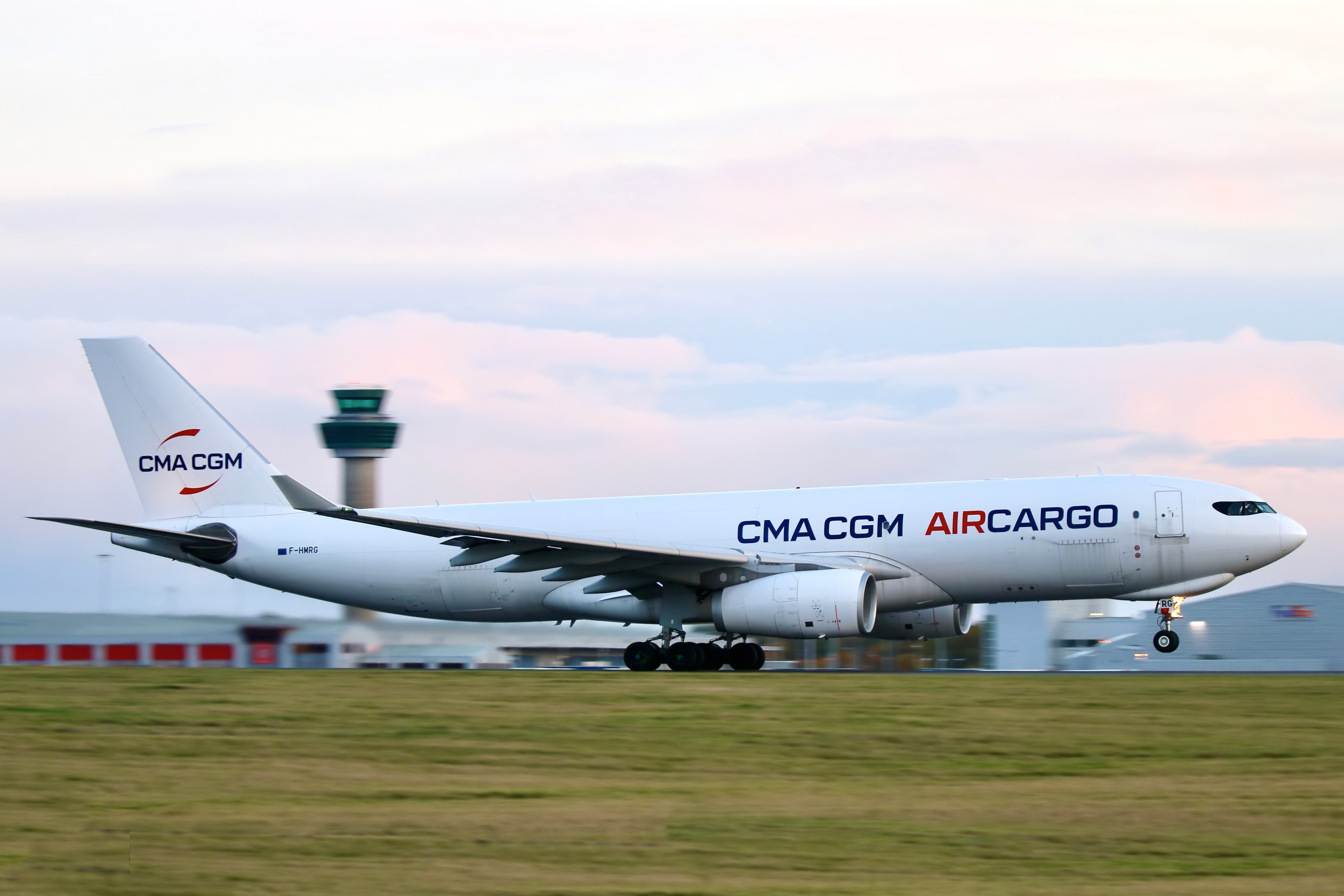
- Airbus A330-200F
IATA	ICAO	Call sign
2C	CMA	FRENCH CARGO
- Founded: 12 February 2021; 5 years ago
- Hubs: Charles de Gaulle Airport
- Fleet size: 6
- Destinations: 9
- Parent company: CMA CGM
- Key people: Damien Mazaudier (CEO)
- Website: www.cma-cgm.com/products-services/air-cargo

CMA CGM Air Cargo is the cargo airline division of CMA CGM, a large French shipping and logistics company. It operates primarily out of Charles de Gaulle Airport in Paris and O'Hare International Airport in Chicago.

== History ==
The company was founded in early 2021 and launched operations with four Airbus A330-200Fs, initially operated by Air Belgium (based in Liège), in the month of March. These aircraft have been progressively re-registered in France and based at Charles-de-Gaulle airport in Paris together with two Boeing 777Fs delivered in June 2022. In November 2021 and June 2022, CMA CGM Air Cargo ordered four Airbus A350Fs and two additional Boeing 777Fs. respectively.

In May 2022, CMA CGM, the airline's parent company, signed a strategic partnership with Air France-KLM to develop their air cargo capacities together. However, this partnership, implemented in April 2023, has been terminated by mutual agreement in January 2024 without change in the 9% stake acquired by CMA CGM in the Franco-Dutch airline group.

In August 2024, the company took delivery of a third Boeing 777F and inaugurated new services between the United States and Asia in partnership with Atlas Air, which operates the aircraft on behalf of the French carrier. The company also retired two of its three Airbus A330-200F towards the end of the second quarter. A fourth Boeing 777F was delivered in April 2025 for operations under the same conditions by Atlas Air.

In April 2025, the cargo operations of Air Belgium were purchased with one Airbus A330 200F and two Boeing 747-8Fs. CMA CGM announced, however, that Air Belgium would be kept as a distinct operation, under its own brand.

In July 2025, the company took delivery of its fifth Boeing 777.

== Destinations ==
CMA CGM Air Cargo flies to the following destinations (this table displays the current scheduled flight destinations published on the company's website or retrieved on tracking sites such as Flightradar24):

Country	City	Airport	Notes
Azerbaijan	Baku	Heydar Aliyev International Airport	
China	Hong Kong	Hong Kong International Airport	Hub
China	Shanghai	Shanghai Pudong International Airport	
China	Ürümqi	Ürümqi Tianshan International Airport	
China	Zhengzhou	Zhengzhou Xinzheng International Airport	
France	Paris	Charles de Gaulle Airport	Hub
South Korea	Seoul	Incheon International Airport	
United States	Anchorage	Ted Stevens Anchorage International Airport	
United States	Chicago	O'Hare International Airport	

== Fleet ==
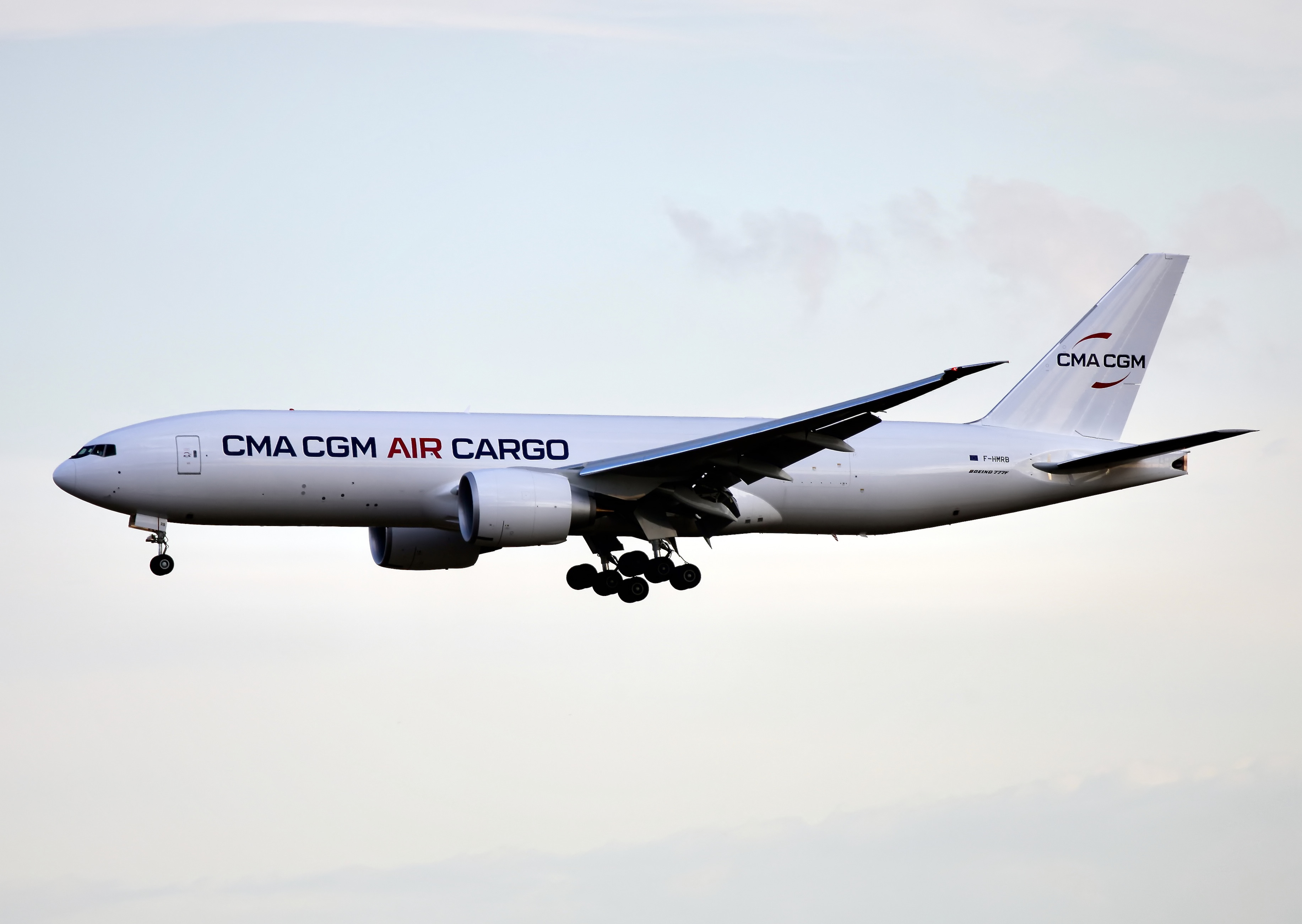
Boeing 777F

As of July 2026, CMA CGM Air Cargo operates the following aircraft:

CMA CGM Air Cargo fleet
Aircraft	In service	Orders	Notes
Airbus A330-200F	1	—	
Airbus A350F	—	8	Deliveries to begin in 2027.
Boeing 777F	3	—	
Boeing 777F	2	—	Operated by Atlas Air.
Total	6	8	

=== Former fleet ===
As of October 2025, CMA CGM Air Cargo operated 1 Airbus A330-200F and 5 Boeing 777F.

== See also ==
- Air cargo
- List of airlines of France
