= List of airlines of Belgium =

This is a list of airlines currently operating in Belgium.

== Scheduled airlines ==
Airline	IATA	ICAO	Image	Callsign	Commenced operations	Notes
Brussels Airlines	SN	BEL		BEELINE	2007	Flag carrier
TUI fly Belgium	TB	JAF		BEAUTY	2004	Scheduled and charter airline previously Jetairfly

== Charter airlines ==
Airline	IATA	ICAO	Image	Callsign	Commenced operations	Notes
ASL airtaxi		BNJ		JET BELGIUM	1998	
Vizion air					2013	Reported no longer operational

== Cargo airlines ==
Airline	IATA	ICAO	Image	Callsign	Commenced operations	Notes
Air Belgium	KF	ABB		AIR BELGIUM	2018	former passenger operator
ASL Airlines Belgium	3V	TAY		QUALITY	2000	
Challenge Airlines	X7	FRH		ACE FREIGHT	2019	headquartered in Israel

== See also ==
- List of defunct airlines of Belgium
- List of airlines
- List of defunct airlines of Europe
