= Freddy Van Gaever =

Belgian businessman and politician

Senator
- In office 12 July 2007 – June 2011

Personal details
- Born: 19 June 1938 Berchem, Belgium
- Died: 15 December 2017 (aged 79)
- Party: Vlaams Belang

Freddy Van Gaever (19 June 1938 – 15 December 2017) was a Belgian politician and a member of the Vlaams Belang. He was elected as a member of the Flemish Parliament in 2004 and served until 2007, when he was coopted to the Belgian Senate (2007–2010).

In his earlier career he was a manager in road haulage and at Delta Air Transport; and in 1984 he created Frevag Airlines. In 1992 he founded VLM Airlines, which he soon sold, and in 2002 VG Airlines, which soon folded.
