= Belgian International Air Services =

Belgian airline

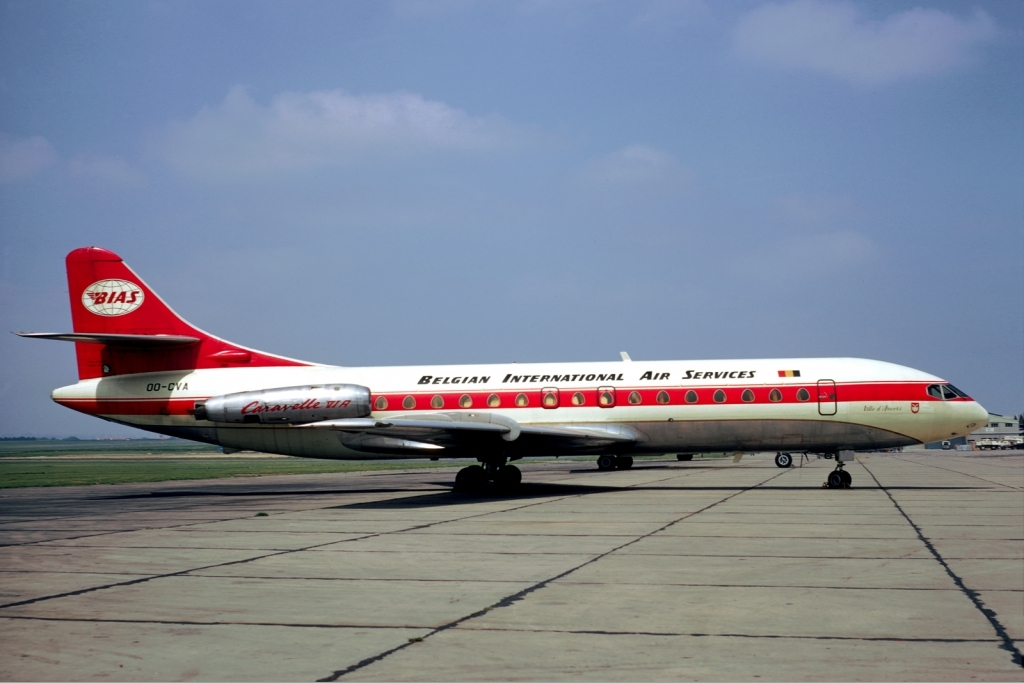
- Sud Aviation SE-210 Caravelle
IATA	ICAO	Call sign
none	AP	ALPHA PAPA
- Founded: 1959
- Ceased operations: 1980
- Operating bases: Brussels Airport
- Headquarters: Antwerp, Belgium

Belgian International Air Services (abbreviated BIAS) was a Belgian airline with its headquarters in Antwerp and Brussels. It was operational between 1959 and 1980 and offered mainly passenger and cargo air charter flights from Brussels Airport to the former Belgian colonies in Central Africa.

== History ==
BIAS was founded on 1 July 1959 by Charles van Antwerpen and George Richardson. The first commercial flight (between Rotterdam and London) took place a week later. In 1967, a co-operation contract with SABENA, the Belgian flag carrier airline was signed, which saw BIAS operating scheduled commuter flights out of Brussels Airport. These were branded as Common Market Commuter, using de Havilland Heron aircraft. The first of these flights (from Eindhoven to Rotterdam) took place on 28 August of that year. The co-operation with SABENA lasted until 1975. BIAS International brand name was used between 1972 and 1973.

Long-haul flight operations with BIAS had already ended in February 1973, when Compagnie Maritime Belge, its majority shareholder at that time, decided that the fleet of Douglas DC-8 aircraft be integrated into Delta Air Transport. BIAS Overseas name was used between 1974 and 1976. When the commuter flights also came to an end in 1975, BIAS continued to do business as an aircraft lease provider until 1980, when the company was dismantled.

== Fleet ==
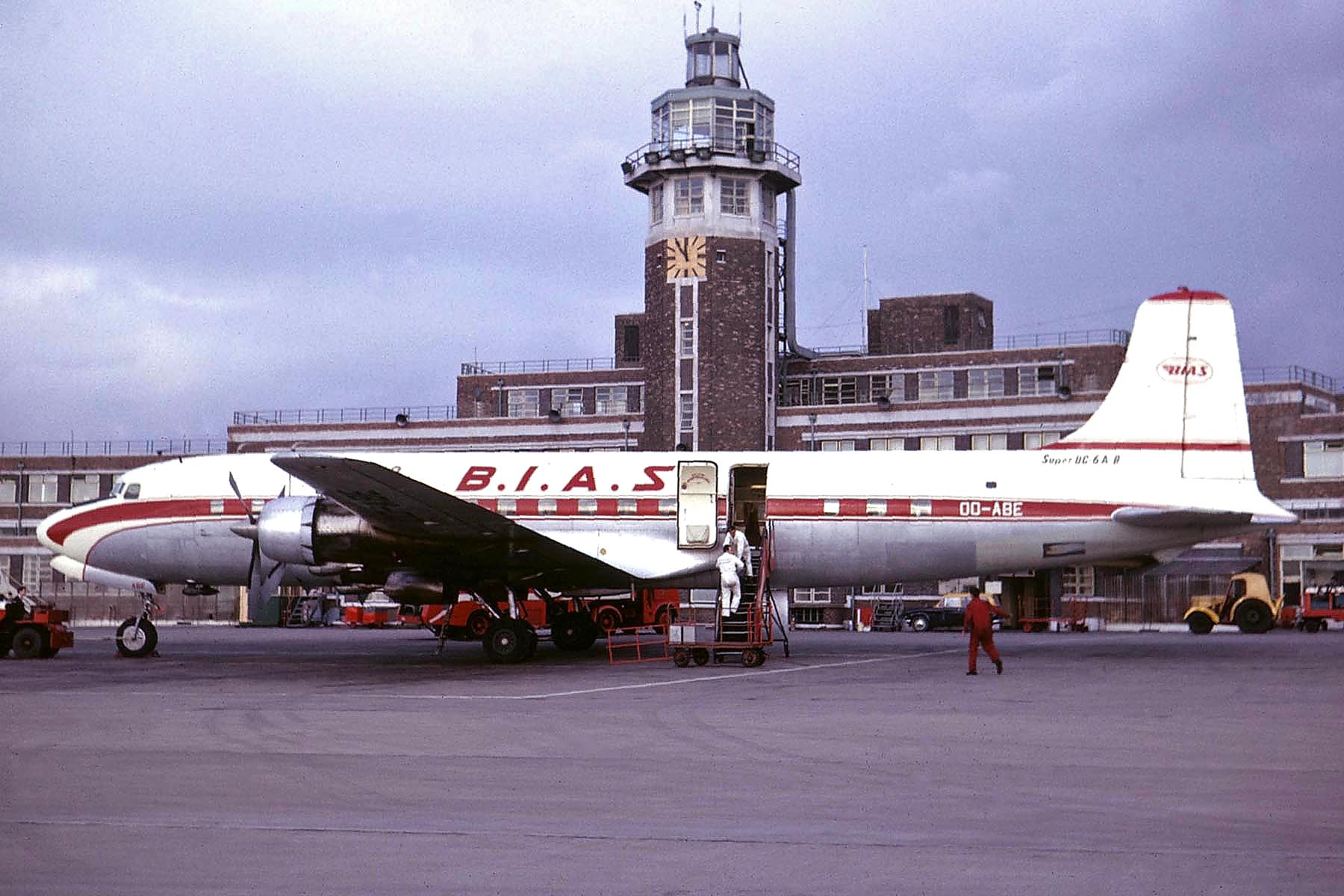
Douglas DC 6A

Over the years, BIAS operated the following aircraft types:

Belgian International Air Services fleet
Aircraft	Introduced	Retired
de Havilland Dove		
de Havilland Heron	1967	1968
Douglas DC-3		1967
Douglas DC-4	1959	1961
Douglas DC-6		
Douglas DC-8	1972	1973
Fokker F27 Friendship	1967	1975
Fokker F28 Fellowship	1971	
Sud Aviation Caravelle	1971	1972

== Accidents and incidents ==
- On 18 February 1966 at 02:04 UTC, a BIAS Douglas DC-6 cargo aircraft (registered OO-ABG) overshot the runway upon landing at Malpensa Airport following a flight from Brussels with 241 calves on board. The aircraft caught fire and was completely destroyed when it crashed into a stand of trees, killing the four occupants.
- On 28 March 1969, a BIAS Douglas DC-3 (registered OO-SBH) was damaged beyond repair in a wheels-up landing in the Libyan Desert. The 17 passengers on board survived the crash.
