= TUI fly Belgium =

Charter airline of Belgium

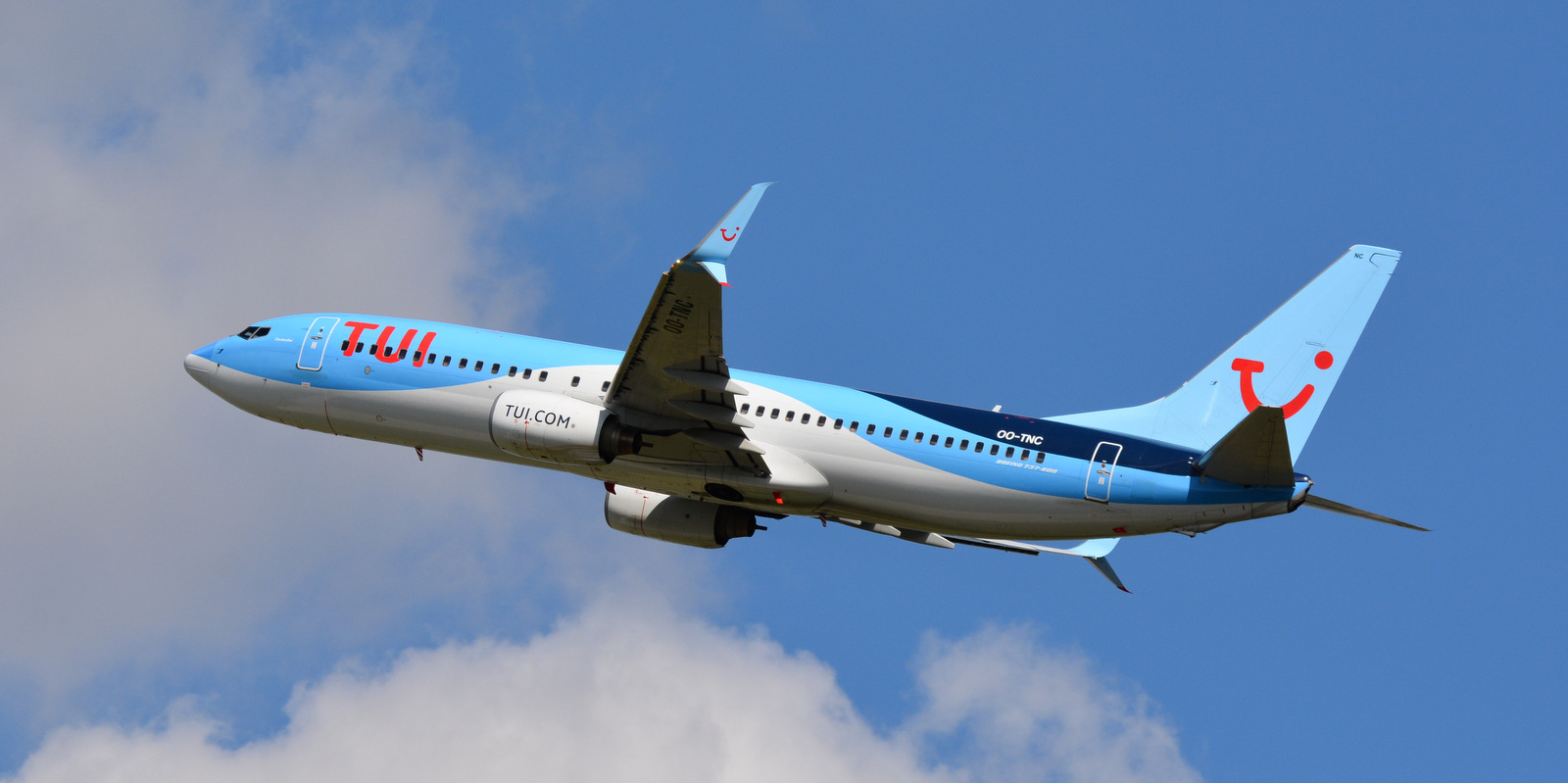
- Boeing 737-800
| IATA | ICAO | Call sign |
|---|---|---|
| TB | JAF | BEAUTY |
- Founded: 13 November 2003; 22 years ago (as Jetairfly)
- Commenced operations: 23 November 2005; 20 years ago
- Operating bases: Antwerp (closes 25 March 2027); Brussels; Ostend/Bruges
- Fleet size: 20
- Destinations: 134
- Parent company: TUI Group
- Headquarters: Zaventem, Flemish Brabant, Belgium
- Key people: Elie Bruyninckx (President)
- Website: www.tuifly.be

TUI fly Belgium, legally incorporated as TUI Airlines Belgium nv and formerly branded Jetairfly, is a Belgian scheduled and charter airline with its registered office at Brussels Airport.

The airline is a subsidiary of the TUI Group. Its sister companies include TUI fly Netherlands, TUI fly Deutschland (Germany), TUI Airways (United Kingdom) and TUI fly Nordic (Sweden).

== History ==
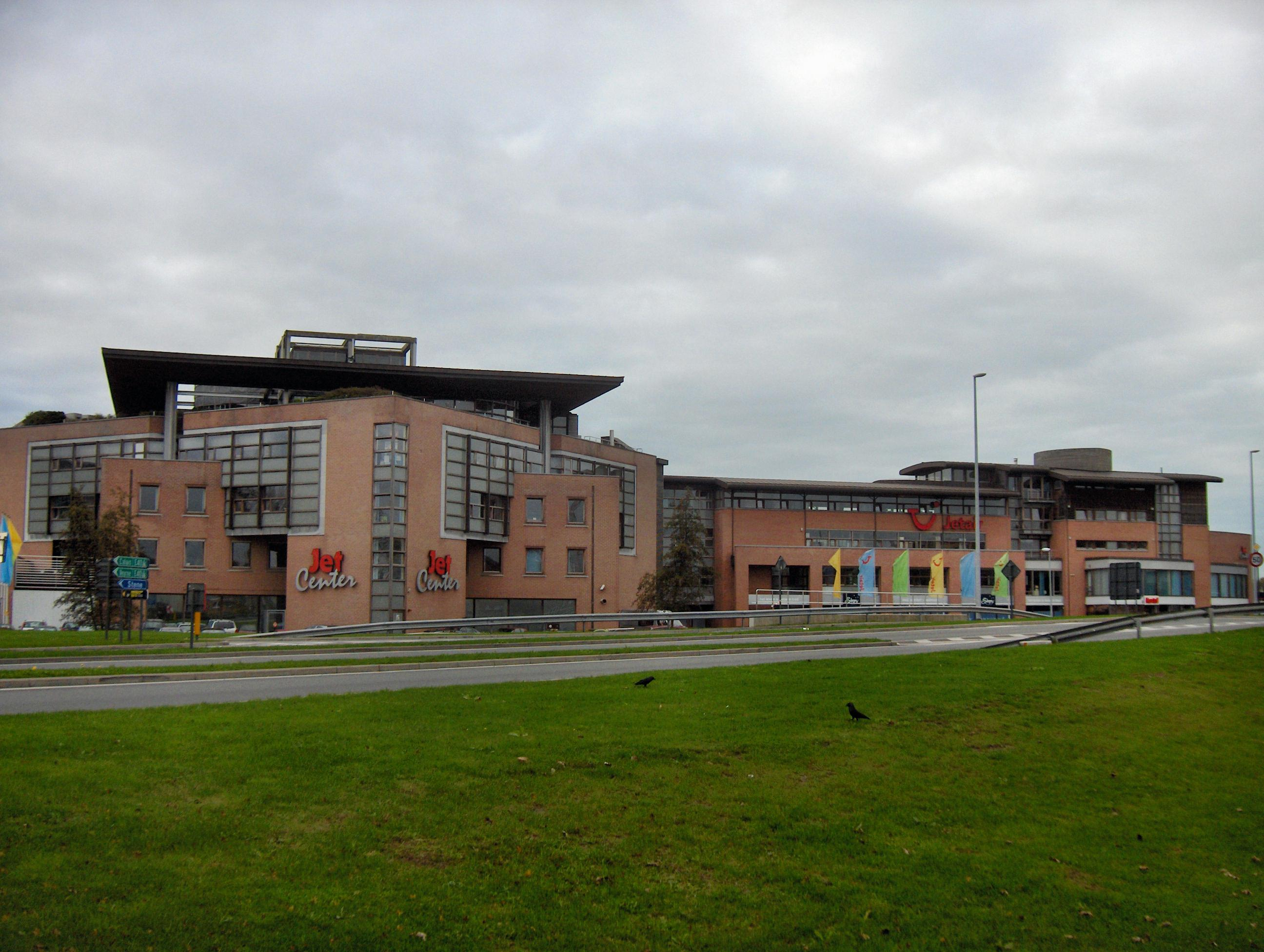
Headquarters in Ostend

The airline was established as Sunrise in 2002 as a home carrier for tour operator Jetair, part of the tourism group TUI AG and re-established as TUI Airlines Belgium on 13 November 2003. The original plans were to operate two aircraft, but after charter company Sobelair (home carrier for Jetair) ceased its operations, it started its operations with 5 Boeing 737-400 aircraft. On 23 November 2005, the airline was renamed Jetairfly as part of the rebranding around the trade name Jetair.

In January 2012, Jetairfly announced that Jet4you, a low-cost Moroccan carrier and also a subsidiary of the TUI AG Group, would be fully integrated in Jetairfly. The merger was complete in April 2012. In March 2012, Jetairfly officially became a full scheduled airline, while previously many of their flights were conducted as charter flights. As a result, all flights can be booked in both directions even by non-EU citizens.

In the beginning of 2013, Jetairfly was the first leisure airline worldwide to introduce the Embraer E190 in its fleet. In the autumn of 2013, the new office building and maintenance hangar "Jetairport" was inaugurated at Brussels Airport. In December 2013, Jetairfly was the first and only Belgian airline to introduce the brand new Boeing 787 Dreamliner.

On 14 November 2014, Jetairfly sealed a wet-lease deal to provide up to four aircraft with crew to operate on behalf of ECAir, the flag carrier of the Republic of the Congo, from mid 2015 onwards.

In 2015, it was the first and only Belgian airline with an ISO 14001 certification for their focus on sustainability and reducing their ecological footprint.

On 13 May 2015, it was announced by the TUI Group that all five of TUI's airline subsidiaries will be named TUI fly, whilst keeping their separate Air Operator's Certificate, taking over three years to complete. On 19 October 2016, Jetairfly received the new brand name TUI fly Belgium with the legal name still being TUI Airlines Belgium NV as the second airline within the TUI group which underwent the name change.

In February 2025, TUI fly Belgium announced it would terminate all long-haul operations and phase out its remaining sole Boeing 787-8 by November 2025. In 2024, the airline already relocated one aircraft of the same type to sister company TUI fly Netherlands, stating that such a small long-haul fleet is no longer commercially viable.

== Destinations ==
TUI fly Belgium has a network of 180 routes to more than 100 airports in the Mediterranean, Red Sea, Caribbean, Canary Islands, Cape Verde Islands, Africa and the United States. The airline's home base is Brussels Airport, but flights are also operated from eight other bases: Liège Airport, Ostend–Bruges International Airport, Antwerp Airport, Lille Airport in France, Mohammed V International Airport Casablanca and Marrakesh Menara Airport in Morocco.

== Fleet ==
=== Current fleet ===
As of January 2026, TUI fly Belgium operates the following aircraft:

TUI fly Belgium fleet
| Aircraft | In service | Orders | Passengers | | | Notes |
| Aircraft | In service | Orders | W | Y | Total | Notes |
|---|---|---|---|---|---|---|
| Boeing 737-800 | 8 | — | — | 189 | 189 | To be retired and replaced by Boeing 737 MAX. |
| Boeing 737 MAX 8 | 7 | 8 | — | 189 | 189 | To replace Boeing 737NG. |
| Boeing 737 MAX 10 | — | 4 | TBA | | | To replace Boeing 737NG. |
| Embraer E195-E2 | 3 | — | — | 136 | 136 | |
| Total | 21 | 12 | | | | |

=== Fleet modernisation ===
TUI Group has 70 737 MAX aircraft on order for the group. The order consists of 28 MAX 10 aircraft, with the remaining variants unspecified as of June 2017. In 2018, TUI fly Belgium was set to receive a total of four new MAX aircraft. Over the next four years, they were scheduled to receive a total of 15 Boeing 737 MAX 8 and four Boeing 737 MAX 10 aircraft. Deliveries of the new aircraft to the TUI Group commenced in January 2018 with the first aircraft, a Boeing 737 MAX 8, delivered to TUI fly Belgium. In 2025, the airline announced it would phase out its sole remaining long-haul aircraft, a single Boeing 787-8, within the same year.

=== Former fleet ===
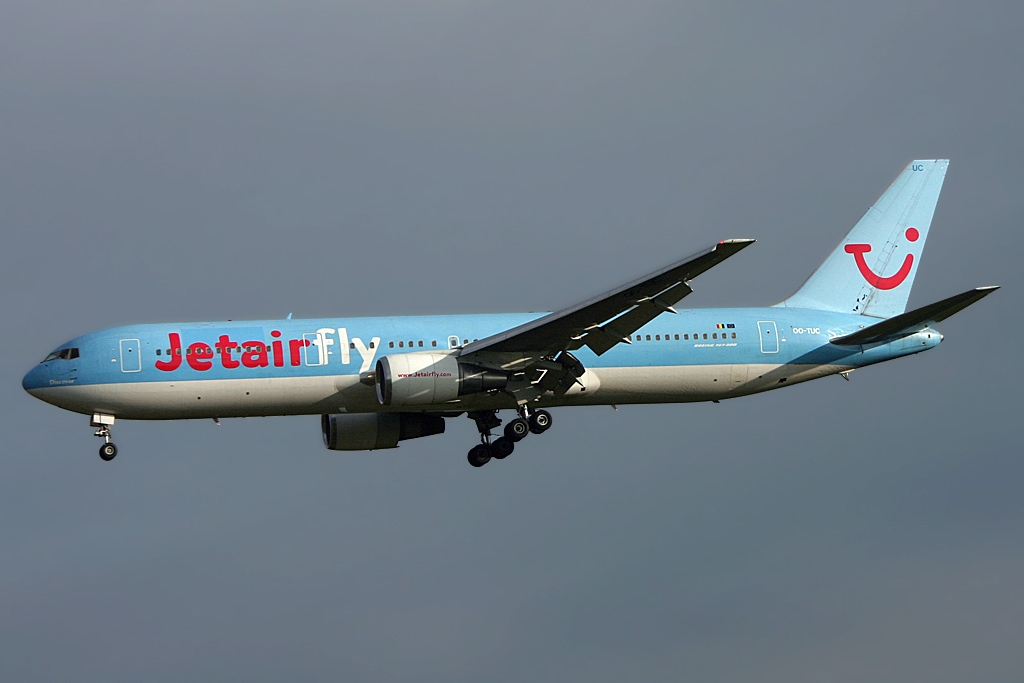
A Jetairfly Boeing 767-300ER

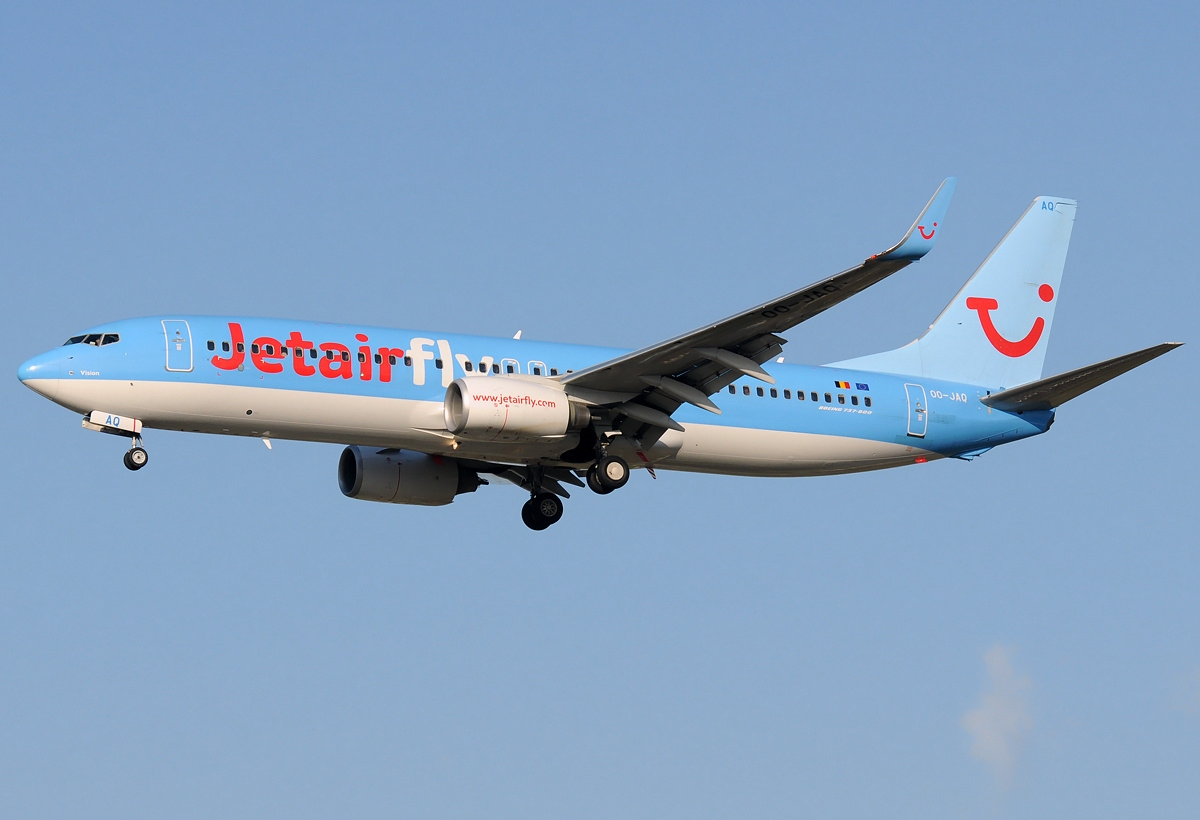
A Jetairfly Boeing 737-800

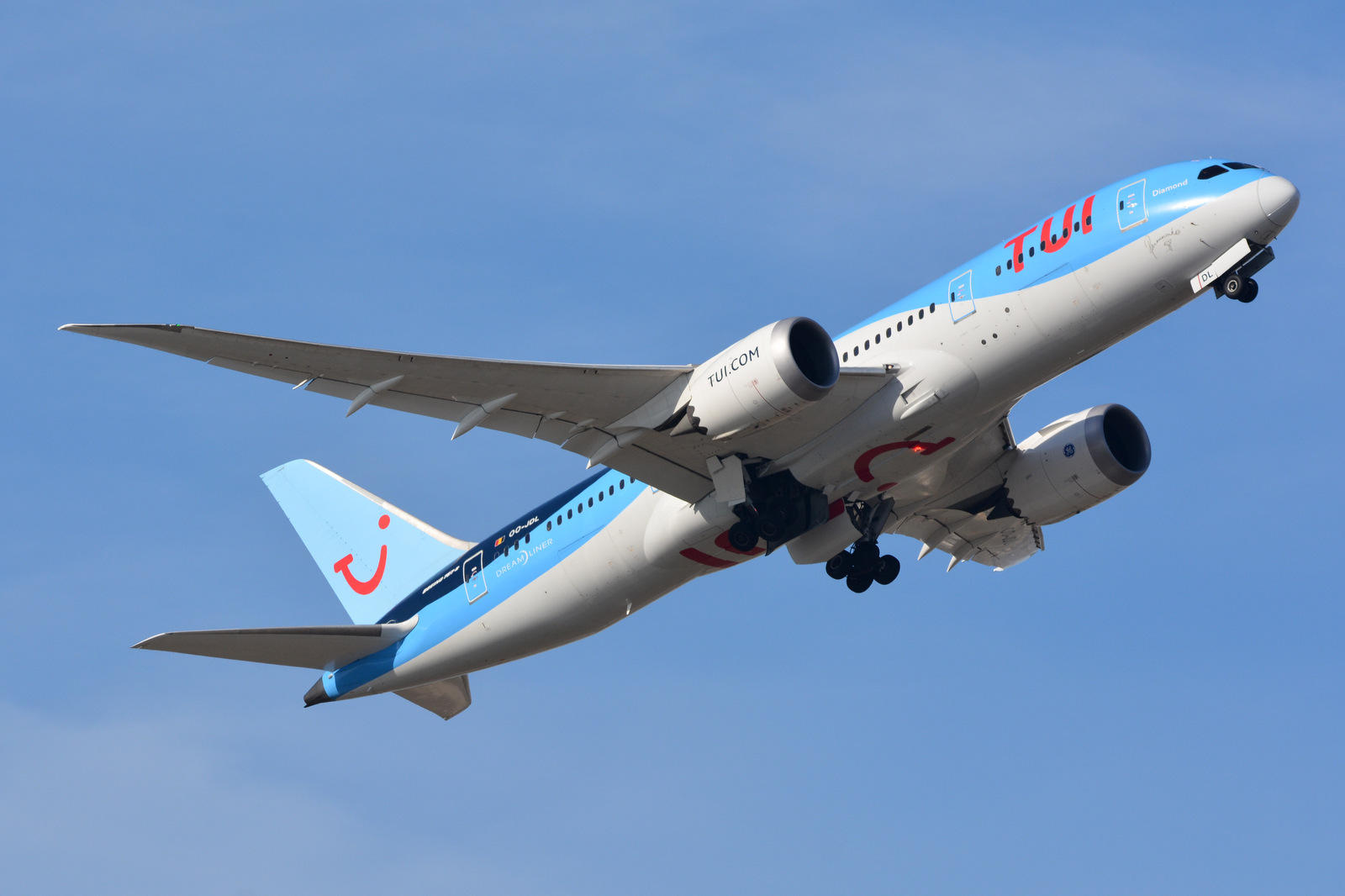
A Boeing 787-8 in 2019

TUI fly Belgium has previously operated the following aircraft:

TUI fly Belgium former fleet
| Aircraft | Total | Introduced | Retired | Notes |
|---|---|---|---|---|
| Airbus A320-200 | 3 | 2018 | 2018 | Leased from Orange2Fly. |
| Airbus A320-200 | 4 | 2018 | 2019 | Leased from SmartLynx Airlines Estonia. |
| Airbus A320-200 | 1 | 2021 | 2021 | Leased from SmartLynx Airlines Estonia. |
| Airbus A321-200 | 1 | 2019 | 2019 | Leased from SmartLynx Airlines. |
| Airbus A330-200 | 1 | 2018 | 2018 | Leased from AirTanker Services. |
| Boeing 737-400 | 7 | 2005 | 2012 | |
| Boeing 737-500 | 1 | 2007 | 2012 | |
| Boeing 737-700 | 6 | 2009 | 2025 | Retired December 2025 |
| Boeing 767-300ER | 4 | 2008 | 2022 | |
| Boeing 787-8 | 1 | 2018 | 2024 | Relocated to TUI fly Netherlands. |
| Embraer E190 | 4 | 2013 | 2023 | |
| Fokker 100 | 1 | 2005 | 2008 | |

== Service ==
=== Short- and medium-haul ===
On short-and medium haul flights, there are three types of service offered on all Economy Class aircraft:

- Economy Class with buy on board service offering snacks and drinks for purchase.
- Economy Class with standard service, including catering (only on flights to Cabo Verde and Senegal).
- Economy Class with Service Plus/VIP Selection, offering premium meals, free alcohol, newspapers. Access to the VIP lounge at Brussels-Zaventem Airport, with separate check-in and security fast lane.

=== Long-haul ===
==== Boeing 767 ====
- Economy Class with standard service including catering (only on long haul flights).
- Comfort Class with lounge access and security fast lane at Brussels-Zaventem Airport, premium meals including free alcohol, newspapers, extra legroom and amenity kits.

==== Boeing 787 ====
- Economy Class with standard service including catering.
- Economy+ Class with extra legroom and enhanced standard services.
- Premium Club with lounge access and security fast lane at Brussels-Zaventem Airport, premium meals including free alcohol, newspapers, extra-legroom seats and amenity kits.

On all long-haul flights there is AVOD for every passenger.

== See also ==
- List of airlines of Belgium
