= Abelag Aviation =

Belgian charter airline

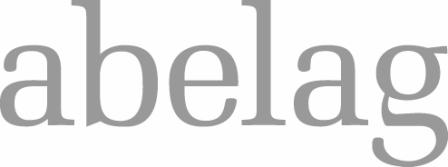

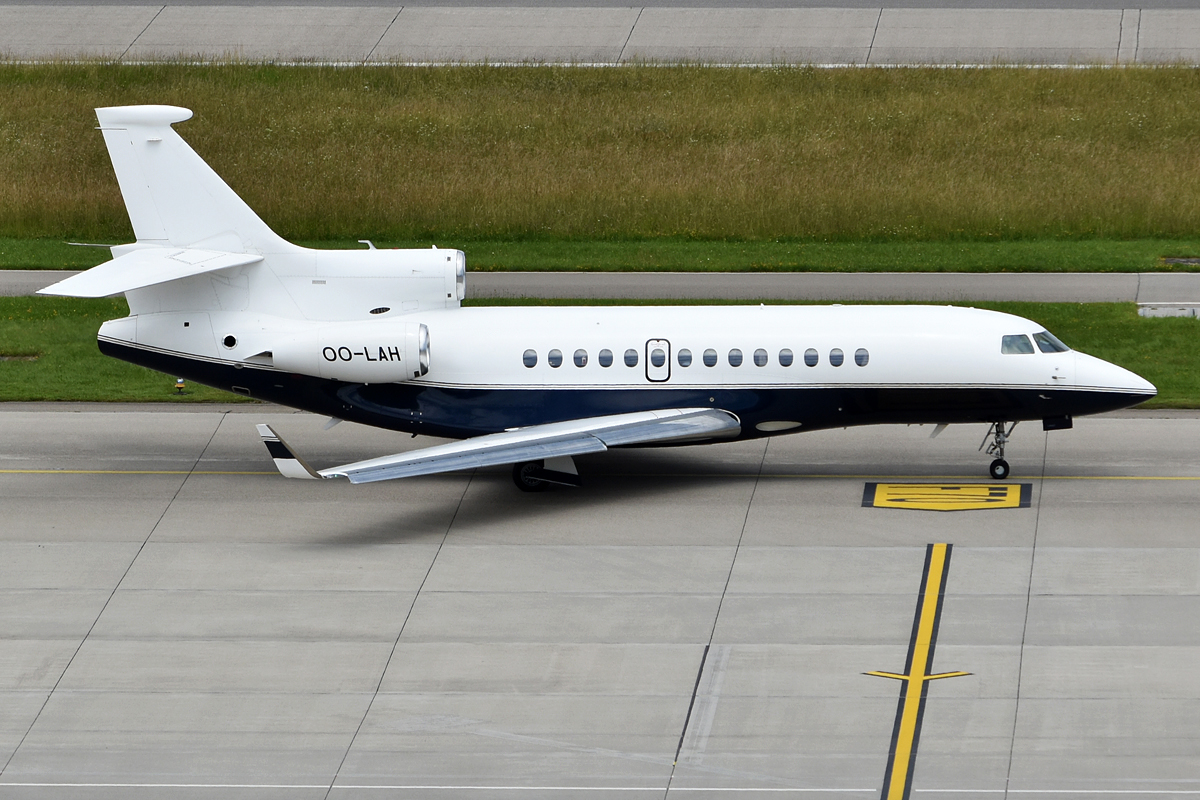
- Falcon 7X
IATA	ICAO	Call sign
W9	AAB	ABG
- Founded: 1964
- Ceased operations: 2016
- Hubs: Brussels Airport
- Fleet size: 18
- Parent company: Luxaviation Group
- Headquarters: Zaventem, Belgium
- Key people: Ward Bonduel (CEO)
- Website: abelag.com

Abelag Aviation was an air charter company based in Brussels, Belgium. It operates ad hoc charter, air taxi, cargo and medical flights, as well as helicopter VIP flights and air ambulance work. Its main base is Brussels Airport, with seats at Antwerp International Airport, Kortrijk-Wevelgem International Airport, Paris Le Bourget Airport, France and Eindhoven Airport.

== History ==
The airline was established in 1964, absorbed Lamda Jet in 1995 and merged with Sky Service in 2005. It is wholly owned by Abelag Aviation Group. In May 2010 Abelag received “the Gold Safety Flight Award” from the European Business Aviation Association, for more than 40 years of safe flights around the world. It inaugurated its Business Aviation Terminal at Brussels Airport in 2012.

In 2013, the company was taken over by Luxaviation Belgium. The brand name Abelag disappeared and was replaced by the trading Luxaviation Belgium since 2016. The social seats of the company in Brussels and Kortrijk-Wevelgem will continue under the name 'Abelag'.

== Fleet ==
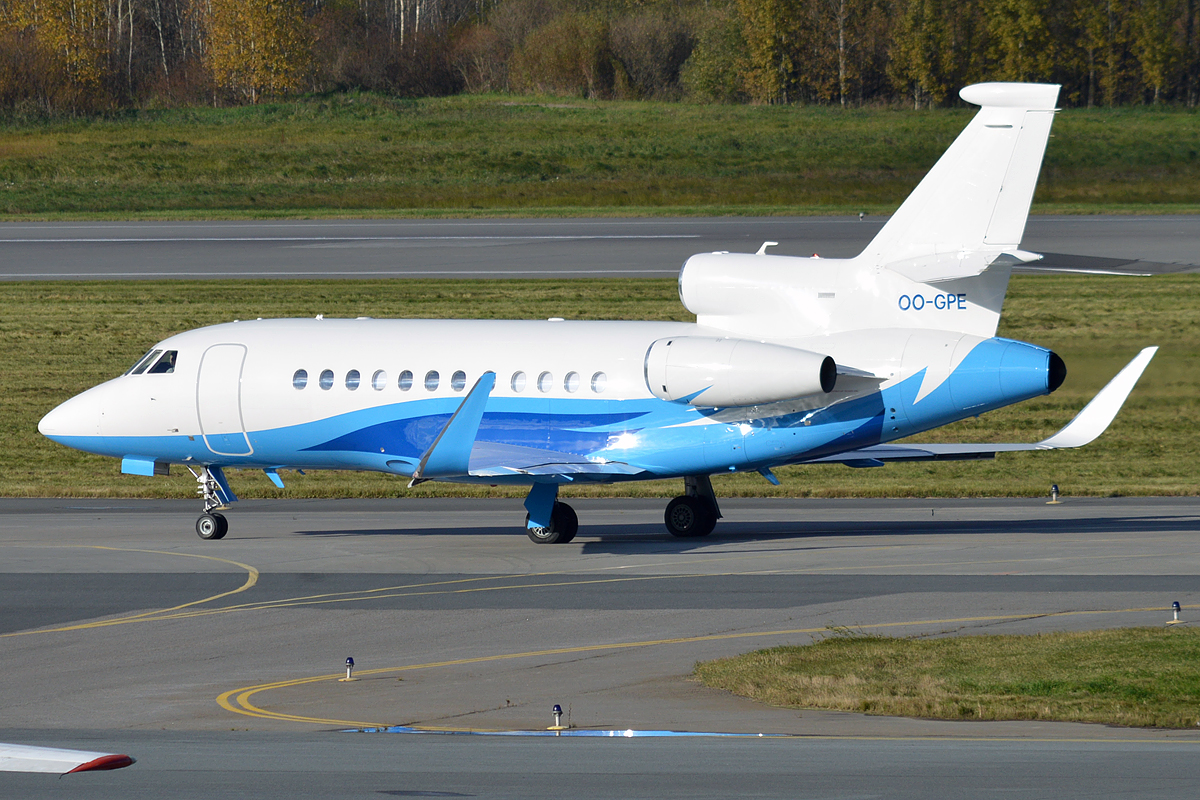
Dassault Falcon 900LX

The Abelag Aviation fleet consists of the following aircraft:

- 1 Cessna Citation CJ2
- 1 Cessna Citation CJ3
- 1 Cessna Citation CJ2+
- 1 Cessna Citation CJ4
- 2 Cessna Citation CJ4 Gen2
- 1 Cessna Citation Excel
- 1 Bombardier Challenger 350
- 4 Dassault Falcon 2000 Lx easy
- 1 Dassault Falcon 900
- 3 Dassault Falcon 7X
- 1 Dassault Falcon 8X
- 1 Bombardier Global 5500
