= Constellation Airlines =

Belgian airline

Constellation International Airlines

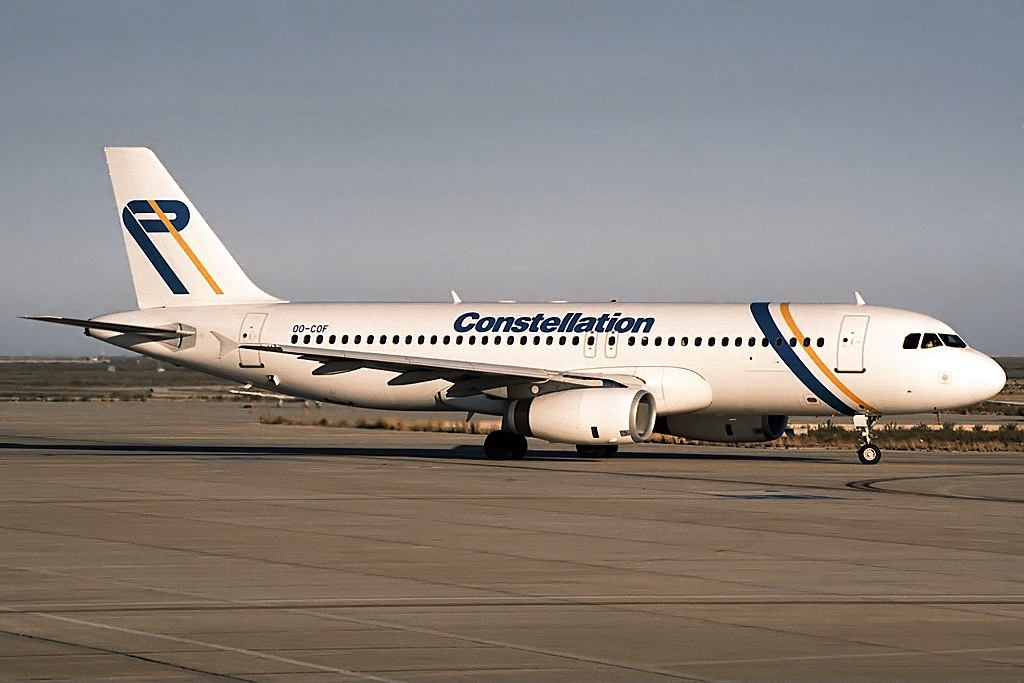
- Airbus A320
IATA	ICAO	Call sign
CQ	CIN	CONSTELLATION
- Founded: 27 May 1978 as Unijet
- Commenced operations: 23 June 1995
- Ceased operations: 3 December 1999
- Operating bases: Brussels Airport, Belgium
- Fleet size: See Fleet below
- Headquarters: Brussels, Belgium

Constellation International Airlines was a Belgian airline that operated during the last part of 1990s.

== History ==
The airline origins go back to May 27, 1978, with the establishment of Unijet. This concern was rebranded BFS International on October 28, 1981. Finally it was refounded with the present name on February 7, 1995. It started operations, with Boeing 727-200 aircraft from Brussels Airport on 23 June 1995, which were replaced by brand new Airbus A320 aircraft, leased from International Lease Finance Corporation. Constellation International Airlines was the first company in the Benelux to operate the Airbus A320 family series aircraft. The main business were holiday flights and flights on behalf of other airlines. Constellation ceased operations due to financial troubles on 3 December 1999, and was declared bankrupt on 15 December 1999.

== Fleet ==
The Constellation Airlines fleet consisted of the following aircraft:

- 2 Airbus A320-232
- 1 Airbus A320-231
- 1 Airbus A321-231
- 2 Boeing 727-2X3
- 2 Boeing 737-3H9
