= Delta Air Transport =

Regional airline of Belgium (1966–2002)

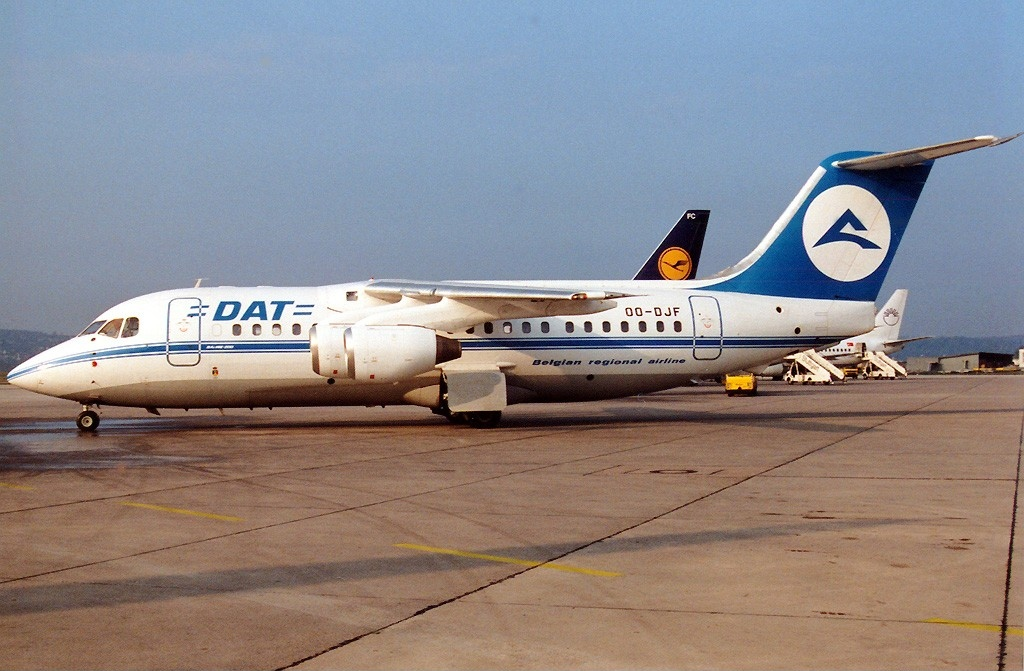
- British Aerospace 146
IATA	ICAO	Call sign
QG; SN	DE; DAT; SAB	DELTAIR
- Founded: 1966
- Commenced operations: 19 September 1967
- Ceased operations: February 2002 (re-organized as SN Brussels Airlines)
- Hubs: Antwerp International Airport
- Focus cities: Brussels Airport
- Parent company: Compagnie Maritime Belge (1973–1996); Sabena (1996–2001)
- Headquarters: Antwerp, Belgium

Delta Air Transport N.V. (abbreviated DAT) was a Belgian airline headquartered in Antwerp, Belgium, operating scheduled and chartered flights, mostly on short-haul routes. It flew to a multitude of regional European destinations on behalf of Sabena during the 1990s and early 2000s.

== History ==
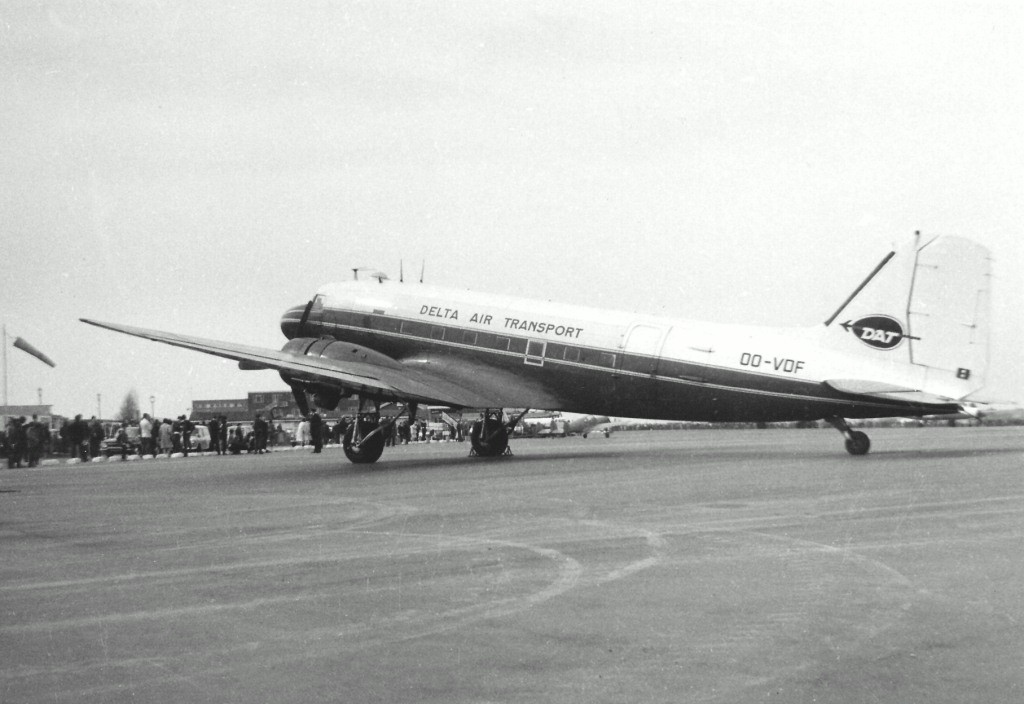
Douglas DC-3

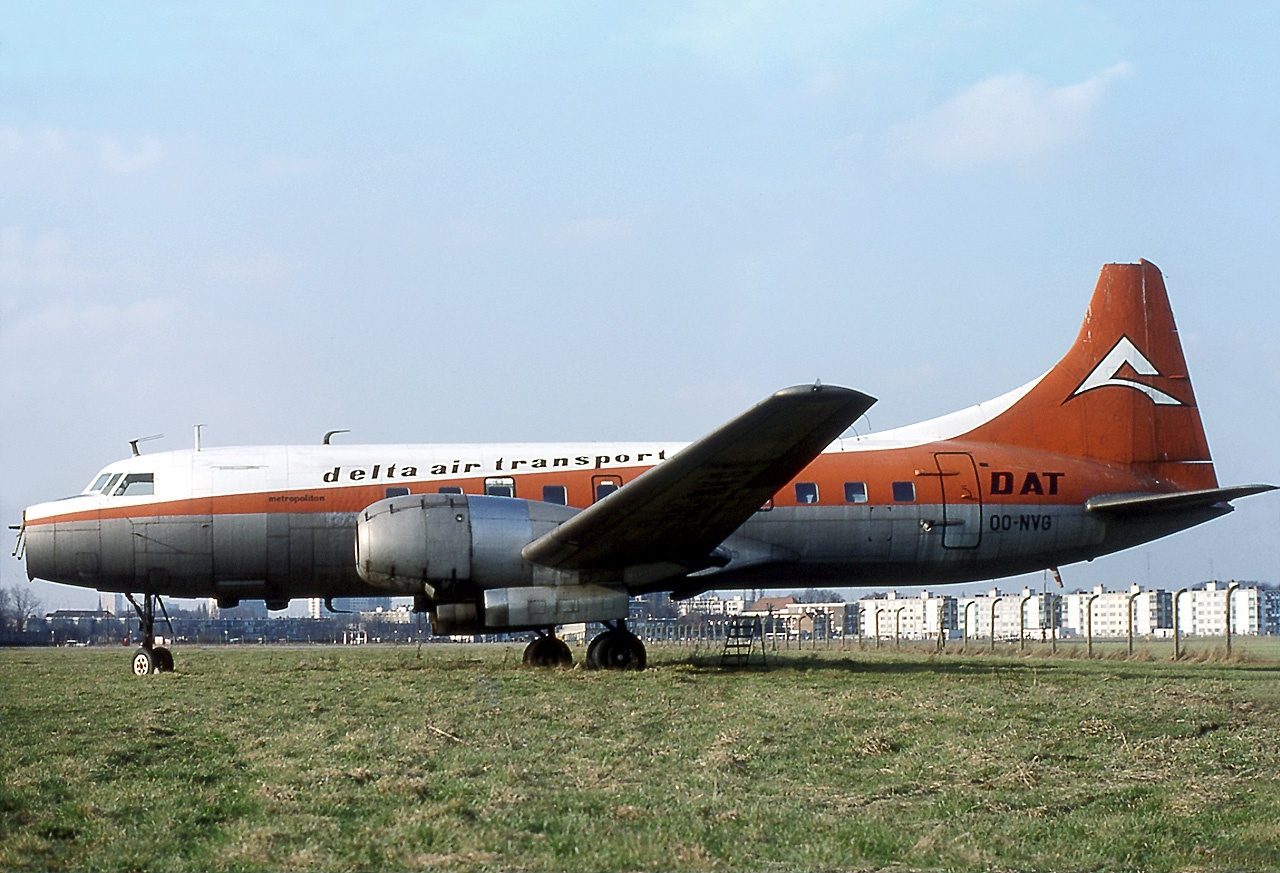
Convair CV-440 Metropolitan udergoing scrapping

Delta Air Transport was founded in June 1966, by Frans Van den Bergh, to perform air taxi and charter flight services with an initial fleet of three Cessna aircraft (one each of the types Skymaster, 210 and 206). Flight operations started in the following year. These were followed by first scheduled flight from Antwerp to Amsterdam on behalf of KLM on September 19, 1967; for that purpose two Beechcraft Queen Air feederliners were acquired (some sources erroneously mention three of the type).

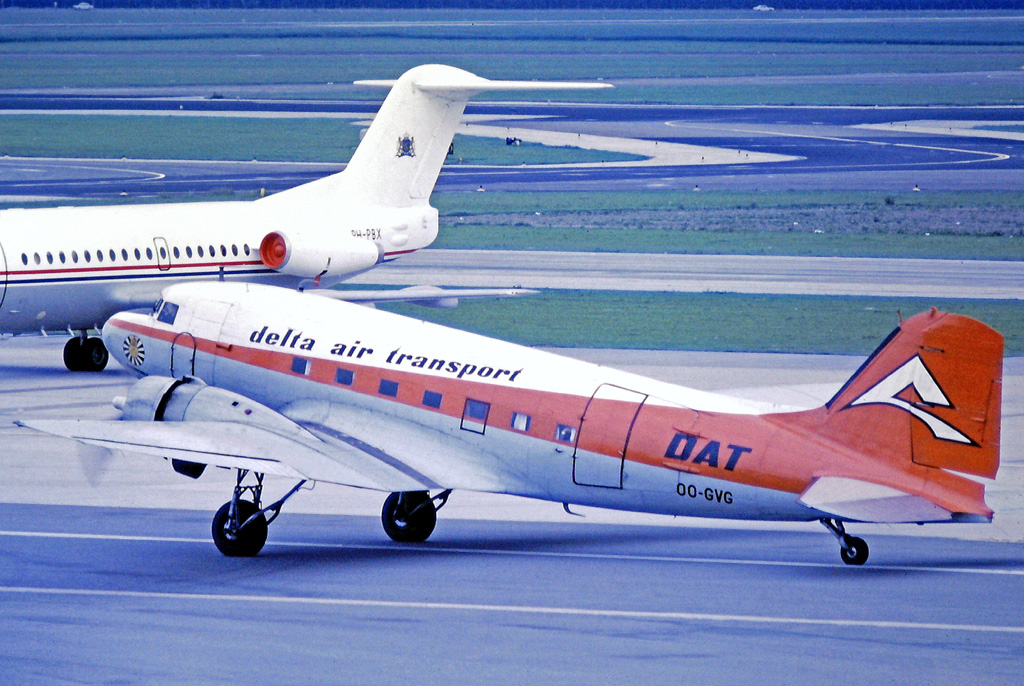
A Douglas DC-3 at Amsterdam Schiphol Airport in June 1972 on a scheduled service from Antwerp Airport

In the following years operations grew when the larger Douglas DC-3, CV440 and DC-6 aircraft joined the fleet over the following years, allowing DAT to operate charter flights on behalf of KLM (which owned a 33.3% stake), Sabena, Crossair and BIAS. In 1973, the majority of the airline's stake was bought by Compagnie Maritime Belge. During 1974, a Boeing 720 was aircraft lease|leased, allowing DAT to offer worldwide charter flights under the Delta International brand, which soon turned out to be unsuccessful, though.

In 1986, Sabena acquired a 49% stake. Consequentially an increasing number of flights were operated on behalf of the Belgian flag airline henceforth (also adopting Sabena flight numbers), using a fleet of British Aerospace 146 aircraft, in favor of which other airliners were gradually phased out. DAT became a member of the European Regional Airlines Association in 1993. In 1996, Sabena bought the remaining KLM stake, and DAT became a wholly owned Sabena subsidiary, moved its headquarters from Antwerp to Brussels and was re-branded as DAT Belgian Regional Airline, offering low-cost flights too. Gradually, the livery of Sabena was applied to all DAT aircraft.

On 7 November 2001, Sabena collapsed due to financial difficulties. DAT could re-launch its operations on 10 November with a flight to Geneva, having received all of Sabena's slots at Brussels Airport and thus being able to maintain the successful European network. Freddy Van Gaever, its former CEO, planned to merge DAT with Virgin Express and add flights towards the United States using former Sabena aircraft. This is the reason why the new DAT Plus brand was adopted. Actually, DAT came under the umbrella of SN Airholding (the liquidator of Sabena), and in 2002 was re-organized under a new AOC. The activities continued for some years as just SN Brussels Airlines which five years later became Brussels Airlines after merging with Virgin Express. DAT operations were totally absorbed in the new Belgian flag airline on March 25, 2007.

== Destinations ==
In its early years, Delta Air Transport offered up to 4 daily scheduled flights between its then base at Antwerp Airport and Amsterdam Airport Schiphol on behalf of KLM (the contract lasted until 1997, when DAT had become a wholly owned Sabena subsidiary), as well as a limited number of routes to the neighboring countries. During the 1990s and early 2000s, DAT was able to grow an extensive short-haul network, as more and more flights were operated on behalf of demising Sabena, eventually becoming the tenth largest regional airline of the continent, transporting more than 1.7 million passengers per year. During its height, the airline had nearly 800 employees, and served the following cities on a scheduled basis from its hub at Brussels Airport:

Austria

- Vienna

Bulgaria

- Sofia

Croatia

- Zagreb

Czech Republic

- Prague

Denmark

- Copenhagen

Finland

- Helsinki

France

- Bordeaux
- Paris
- Lyon
- Marseille
- Nice
- Strasbourg
- Toulouse

Germany

- Berlin
- Düsseldorf
- Frankfurt
- Hamburg
- Hanover
- Munich
- Stuttgart

Greece

- Athens

Hungary

- Budapest

Ireland

- Dublin

Italy

- Bologna
- Florence
- Milan
- Naples
- Rome
- Turin
- Venice

Luxemburg

- Luxembourg

Netherlands

- Amsterdam

Norway

- Oslo

Poland

- Warsaw

Portugal

- Lisbon
- Porto

Romania

- Bucharest

Spain

- Barcelona
- Bilbao
- Madrid
- Málaga
- Seville
- Valencia

Sweden

- Gothenburg
- Stockholm

Switzerland

- Basel
- Geneva
- Zürich

United Kingdom

- Birmingham
- Bristol
- Edinburgh
- Glasgow
- Leeds
- London
- Manchester
- Newcastle upon Tyne

== Fleet ==
Over the years, Delta Air Transport operated the following aircraft types:

Aircraft	Introduced	Retired
Aérospatiale N 262	1976	
Beechcraft Queen Air	1967	
Boeing 720	1974	1975
British Aerospace 146 (various versions)	1989	2002
Cessna 206	1966	
Cessna 210	1966	
Cessna Skymaster	1966	
Convair CV-440	1972	1977
Dash 8-300	2001	2002
Douglas DC-3	1968	1972
Douglas DC-4		
Douglas DC-6		1978
Douglas DC-8	1973	
Embraer EMB 120 Brasilia	1988	1997
Fairchild Hiller FH-227	1977	
Fairchild Swearingen Metroliner		
Fokker F28 Fellowship		1997

=== Photographic gallery of main aircraft types ===
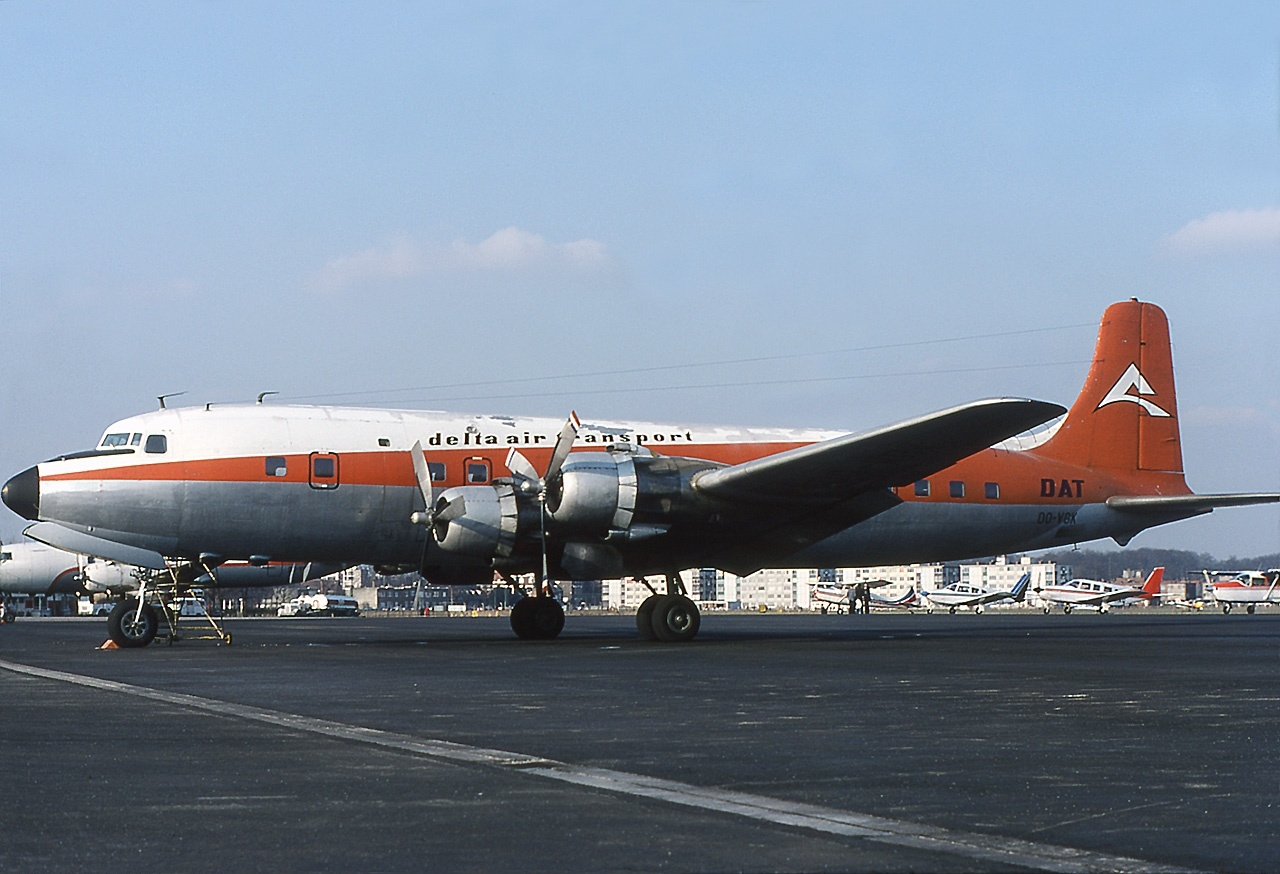
Douglas DC-6

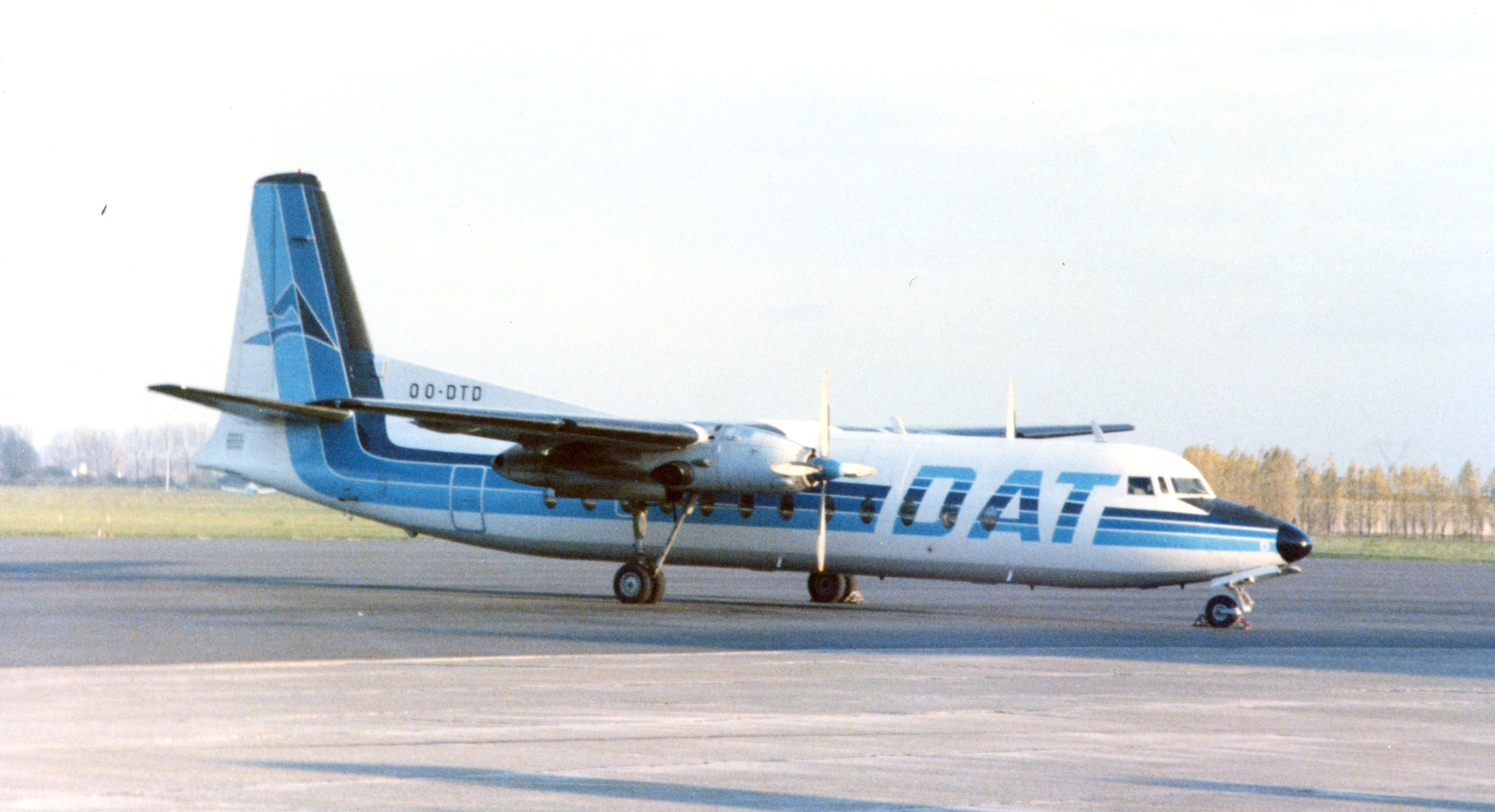
Fairchild Hiller FH-227

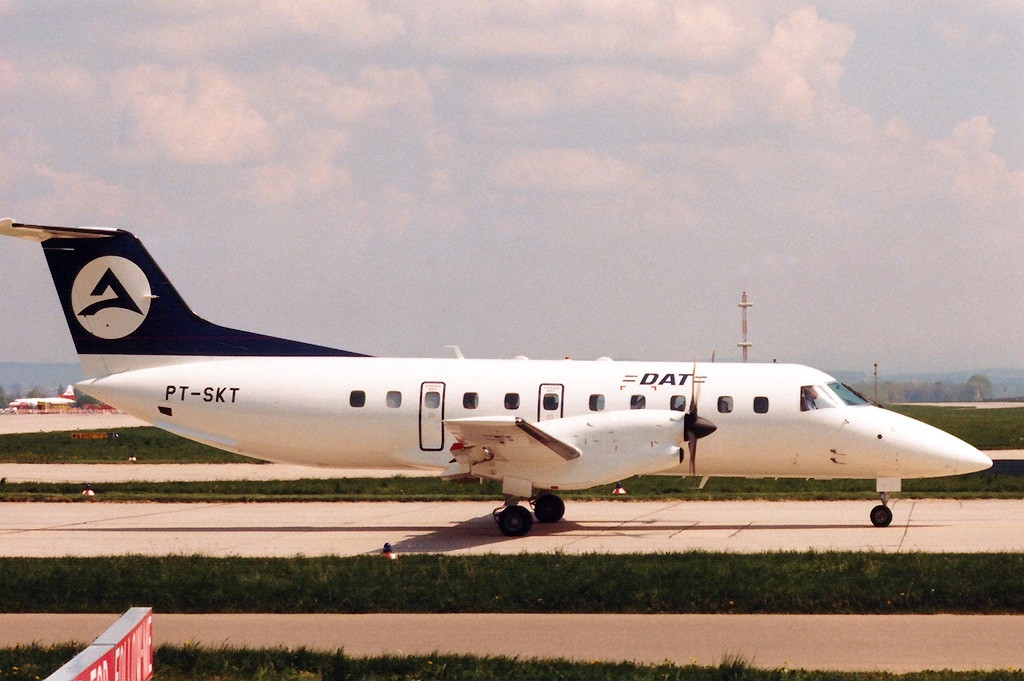
Embraer EMB 120 Brasilia

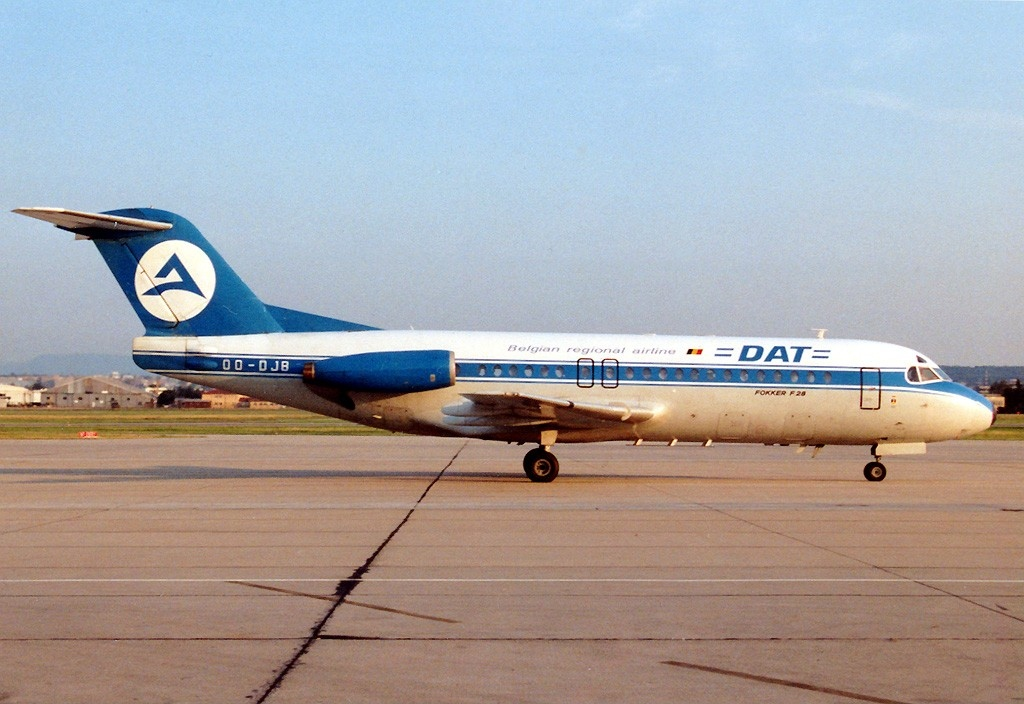
Fokker F28 Fellowship

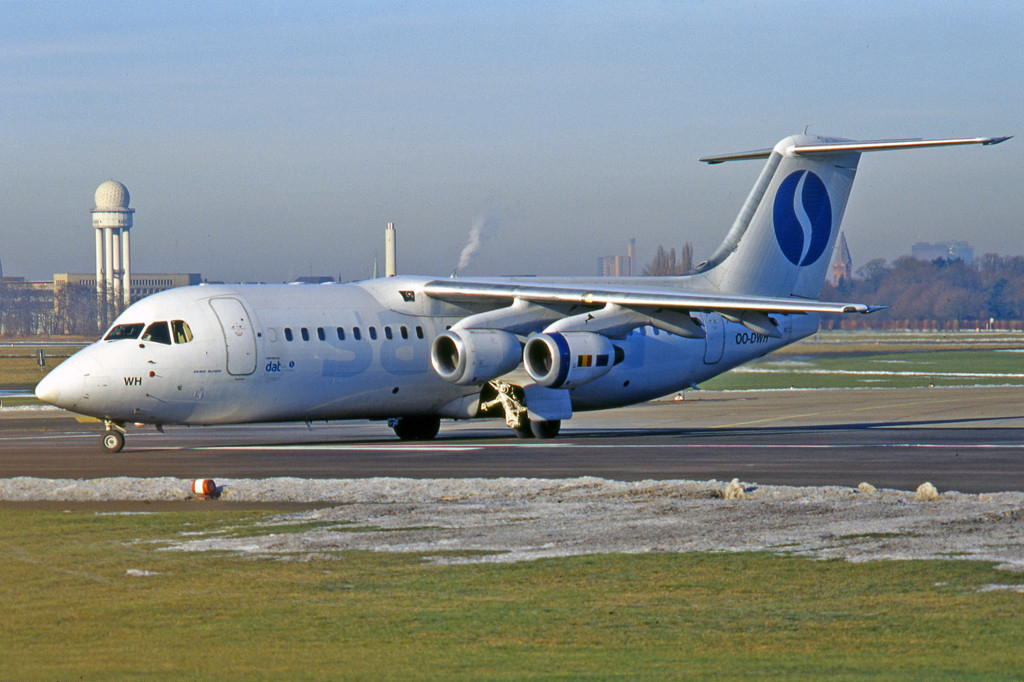
British Aerospace 146

== Accidents and incidents ==
- On 4 October 1974 at 20:01 local time, the flight engineer of a DAT Douglas DC-6 (registered OO-VGB) decided to retract the nose gear during take-off run at London Southend Airport even though the aircraft had not yet lifted off, which happened due to a communication error with the pilots. The airplane slid along the runway, during which it was damaged beyond repair. 99 passengers had been on board the flight to Antwerp, one of which was severely injured (another four received minor injuries from evacuating the aircraft). The six crew members remained uninjured.
- On 2 June 1990 at 19:11 local time, a DAT Embraer EMB 120 Brasilia (registered OO-DTA) without any passengers collided with a Piper Aerostar during a low-pass manoeuvre at Antwerp International Airport, resulting in the crash of the Piper and the death of the four people on board. The two aircraft had been performing a close formation flight for aerial photographs of the DAT Embraer for advertising purposes.
