= Air Belgium =

Belgian charter airline

Air Belgium S.A.

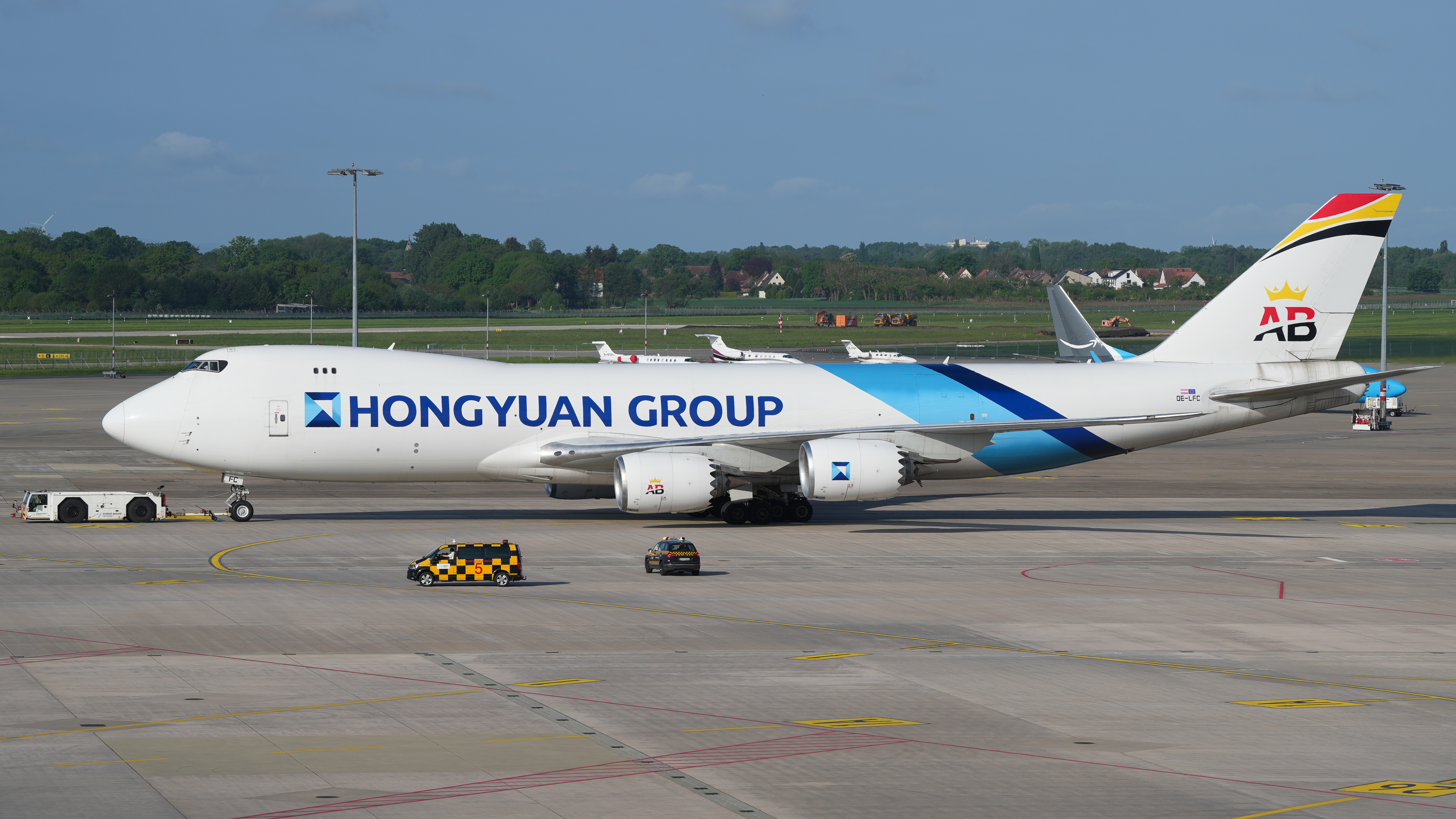
- Boeing 747-8F operated on Hongyuan Group behalf
IATA	ICAO	Call sign
KF	ABB	AIR BELGIUM
- Founded: 27 May 2016; 10 years ago
- Commenced operations: 3 June 2018; 8 years ago
- Hubs: Brussels Airport
- Fleet size: 4
- Parent company: CMA CGM
- Headquarters: Mont-Saint-Guibert, Belgium
- Employees: 124 (2025)
- Website: airbelgium.com

Air Belgium S.A. is a Belgian cargo airline headquartered in Mont-Saint-Guibert and based at Brussels Airport. Founded in 2016, it initially launched as a scheduled passenger airline on 3 June 2018, before transitioning to charter and cargo operations on 3 October 2023. On 30 April 2025, Air Belgium went bankrupt, and was taken over by CMA CGM on the same date. The French shipping and logistics group, which also owns CMA CGM Air Cargo, announced that Air Belgium would be kept as a separate brand.

== History ==
=== Foundation and early years ===
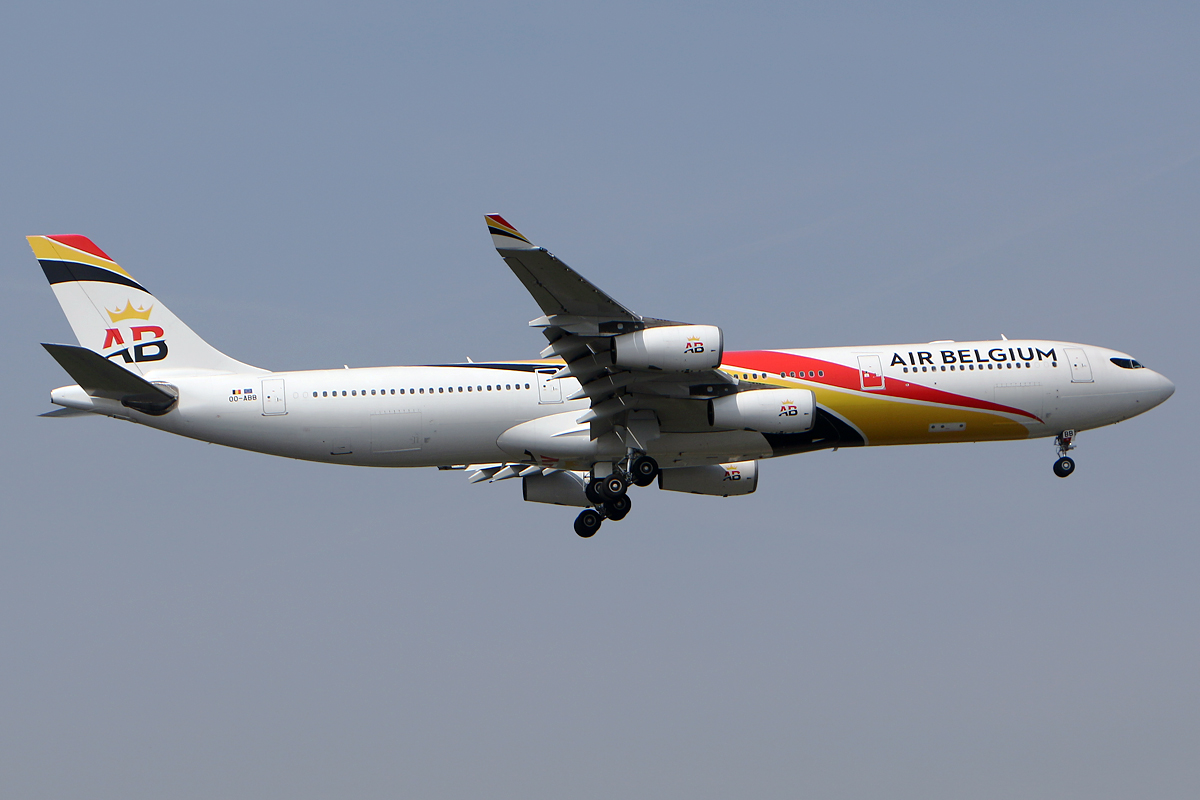
Airbus A340-300 was the airline's first type and was retired in 2022

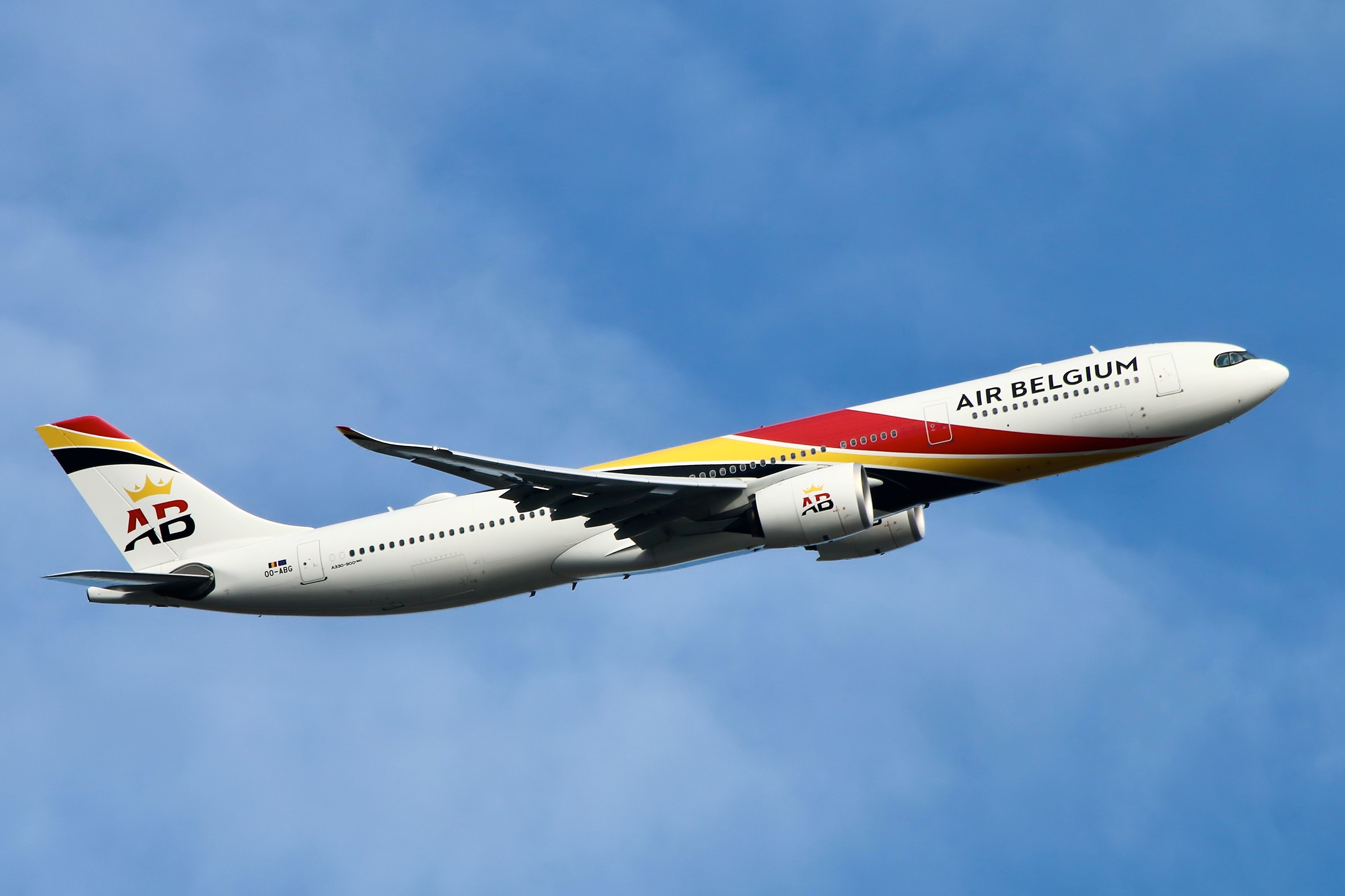
Airbus A330-900

In the summer of 2016, the company was started with CEO Niky Terzakis, who worked previously for ASL Airlines Belgium, formerly TNT Airways. The intention was to link Belgium to destinations in Hong Kong, Beijing, Shanghai, Xi'an, Wuhan, Zhengzhou and Taiyuan from its base at Brussels South Charleroi Airport.

The first flight from Brussels to Hong Kong was planned to take off in October 2017, however this was postponed as the airline lacked an air operator's certificate (AOC). In December 2017, Air Belgium announced that the first flight should now take place in March 2018 from Brussels South Charleroi Airport instead of Brussels Airport due to lower airport taxes and easy accessibility; it was also announced that, for business class and premium passengers, the airline would operate from a new dedicated terminal which would be built at the executive terminal, while economy passengers would use the regular terminal.

On 14 March 2018, it was announced that the airline had received its AOC from the Belgian civil aviation authority and planned to begin operating scheduled flights from mid-April. On 29 March 2018, the airline flew its first revenue service by operating its Airbus A340-300 in Air Belgium livery on behalf of Surinam Airways from Amsterdam to Paramaribo. On 25 April 2018, the airline announced a delay to its own inaugural flight (to Hong Kong) from 30 April to 3 June 2018 due to not having the rights to operate in Russian airspace.

Since the commencement of the service for the first destination, it started operating a scheduled service between Charleroi and Hong Kong. Moreover, the other aircraft of the fleet was provided to Air France for a daily service between Paris-Charles de Gaulle and Libreville during the 2018 summer season.

On 21 September 2018, the airline announced that scheduled operations between Charleroi and Hong Kong would be suspended during winter, and the airline would instead focus on charter operations. The route should have restarted at the end of March 2019, but two weeks before the planned date, Air Belgium instead announced that they would be terminating the route and working towards starting new services to mainland China in mid-2019, and the Americas in late 2019 or early 2020.

On 16 July 2019, the airline announced plans for flights to Fort de France and Pointe-à-Pitre by December 2019, with further plans to fly to Kinshasa and Miami.

=== Developments since 2020 ===
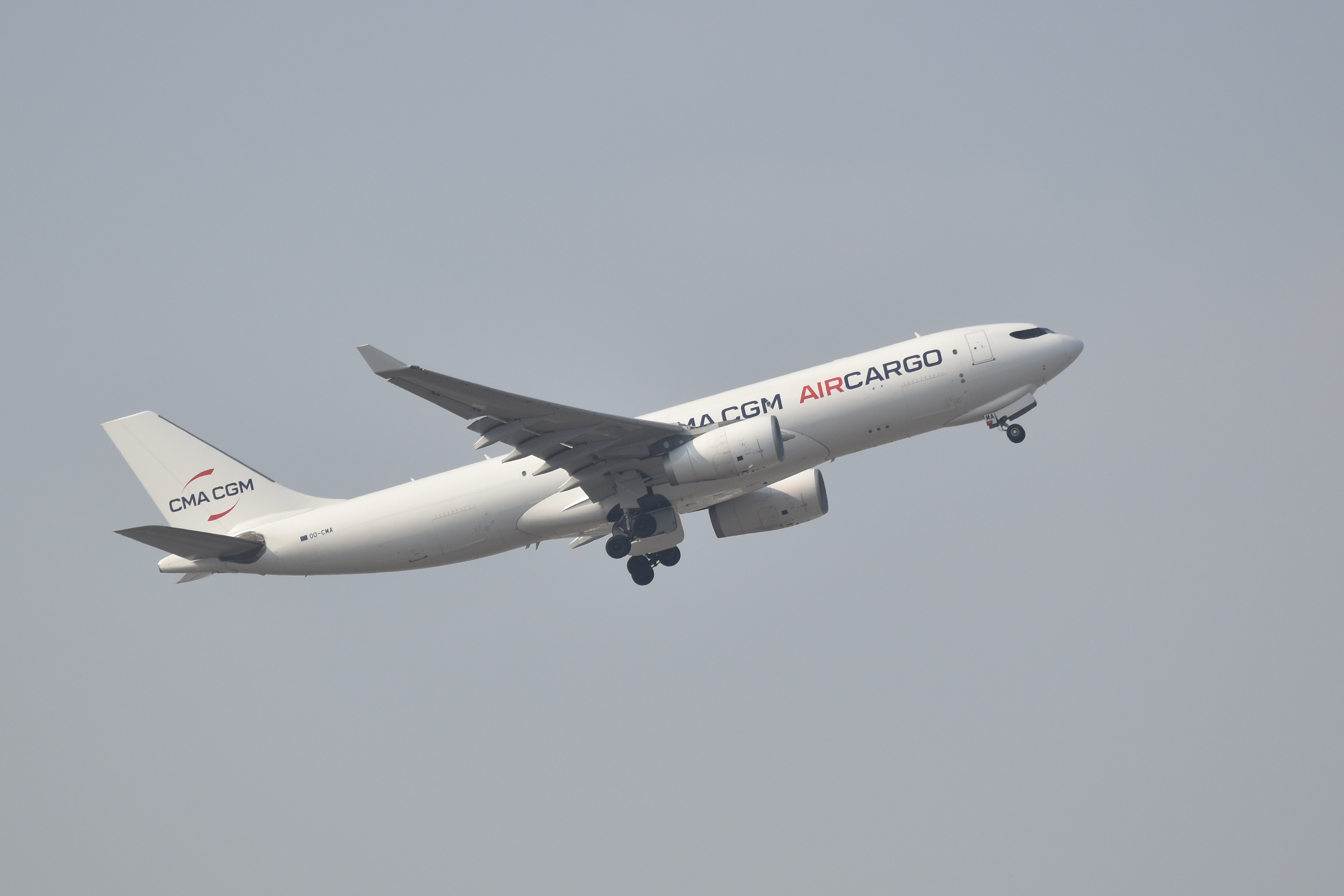
An Airbus A330-200F operated for CMA CGM Air Cargo

On 30 January 2021, Air Belgium announced that cargo flights would start with four Airbus A330-200F based in Liège Airport, on behalf of French shipping company CMA CGM, which purchased the airframes and contracted with Air Belgium to fly them. These four planes are progressively re-matriculated in France during the 2022-2023 winter. On 1 July 2021, Air Belgium announced it would add two Airbus A330-900s to its fleet and operate services between Brussels Airport and Mauritius from 15 October 2021.

In November 2022, Air Belgium announced the need for a recapitalisation to avoid bankruptcy after accumulating severe losses. The airline already received €19 million during the same year from its Chinese minority owners which have been already used up as the airline's primary charter business did not fully recover in the wake of the coronavirus pandemic. The airline subsequently also announced it would cut and suspend several passenger routes. In January 2023, Air Belgium announced that sufficient funding has been secured from private investors to keep operations running while there was no further financial support from the state.

In September 2023, Air Belgium announced that all scheduled passenger flights would end on 3 October 2023, and their fleet would be operated for other airlines on an ACMI basis as part of the termination of passenger services.

In January 2024, it was reported that Air Belgium significantly downsized its workforce and plans to phase out both of their barely two year old Airbus A330-900 due to ongoing engine issues.

On 19 September 2024, it was reported that Air Belgium had filed for judicial reorganization, with plans to end its passenger flight operations by October 3. Air Belgium's cargo and ACMI businesses will continue to operate, and all flights scheduled after October 3 will be refunded to customers.

On 30 April 2025, it was officially announced that the French logistics group CMA CGM was taking over the cargo activities of Air Belgium, together with 124 jobs. The company Air Belgium NV was declared bankrupt by the commercial court of Walloon Brabant during the morning.

== Fleet ==
=== Current fleet ===
As of August 2025, Air Belgium operates the following aircraft:

Air Belgium fleet
Aircraft	In service	Notes
Airbus A330-200/P2F	2	Operating for Hongyuan Group
Boeing 747-8F	2	Operating for Hongyuan Group
Total	4	

=== Former fleet ===
The airline previously operated the following aircraft:

Air Belgium retired fleet
Aircraft	Total	Introduced	Retired	Notes
Airbus A330-200	2	2022	2024	
Airbus A330-200F	4	2021	2023	Operated for CMA CGM Air Cargo
Airbus A330-900	2	2022	2024	
Airbus A340-300	4	2018	2022	Replaced by Airbus A330-900

== See also ==
- List of airlines of Belgium
