= Air Belgium (1979–2000) =

Belgian airline

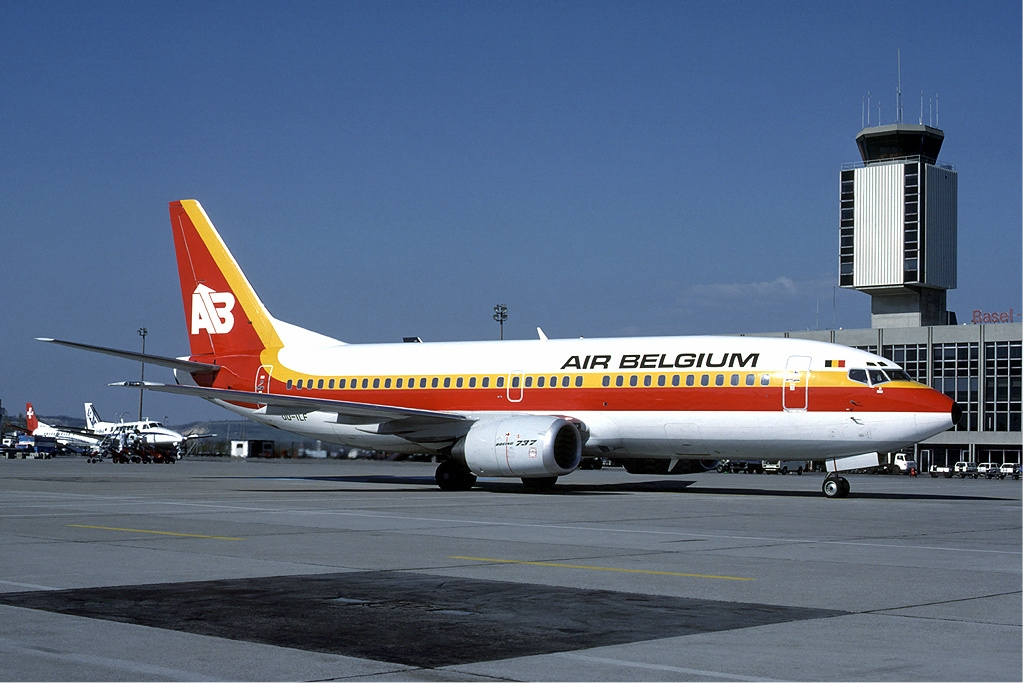
- Boeing 737-400
IATA	ICAO	Call sign
AJ	ABB	AIR BELGIUM
- Founded: 3 May 1979
- Ceased operations: 30 October 2000
- Hubs: Brussels Airport
- Parent company: Airtours (1998-2000)

Air Belgium S.A. was a Belgian charter airline that was established in May 1979 as a leisure carrier and operated until 2000.

== History ==
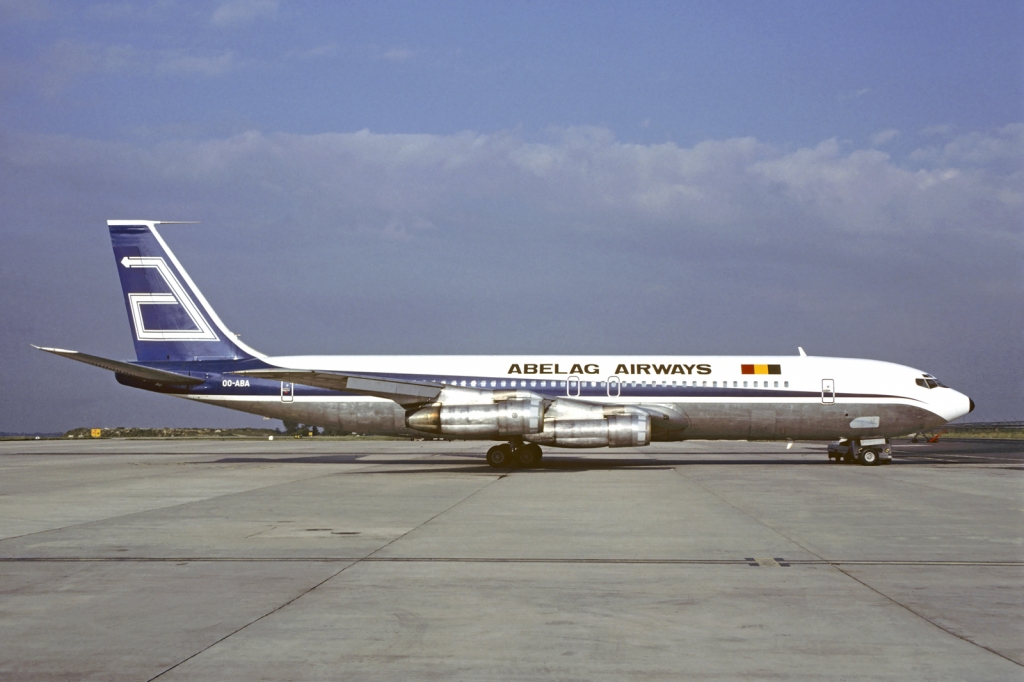
Abelag Airways Boeing 707-320C at Charles de Gaulle Airport in 1979

On 3 May 1979, tour operator Sun International and charter company Abelag Aviation partnered to establish Abelag Airways. In the following month it began operations with a Boeing 707 and a Boeing 737-200, flying from Brussels Airport to destinations in the Mediterranean. After Abelag Aviation withdrew its support, the airline was renamed Air Belgium International S.A. on 15 February 1980.

In 1990, in addition to European/Mediterranean destinations served, the airline launched operations to destinations such as the United States and Mexico.

In 1998, Air Belgium and its parent company were bought by Airtours from Great Britain. By 30 October 2000, Air Belgium had ceased all flight operations.

== See also ==
- List of defunct airlines of Belgium
