= VG Airlines =

Airline of Belgium (2002)

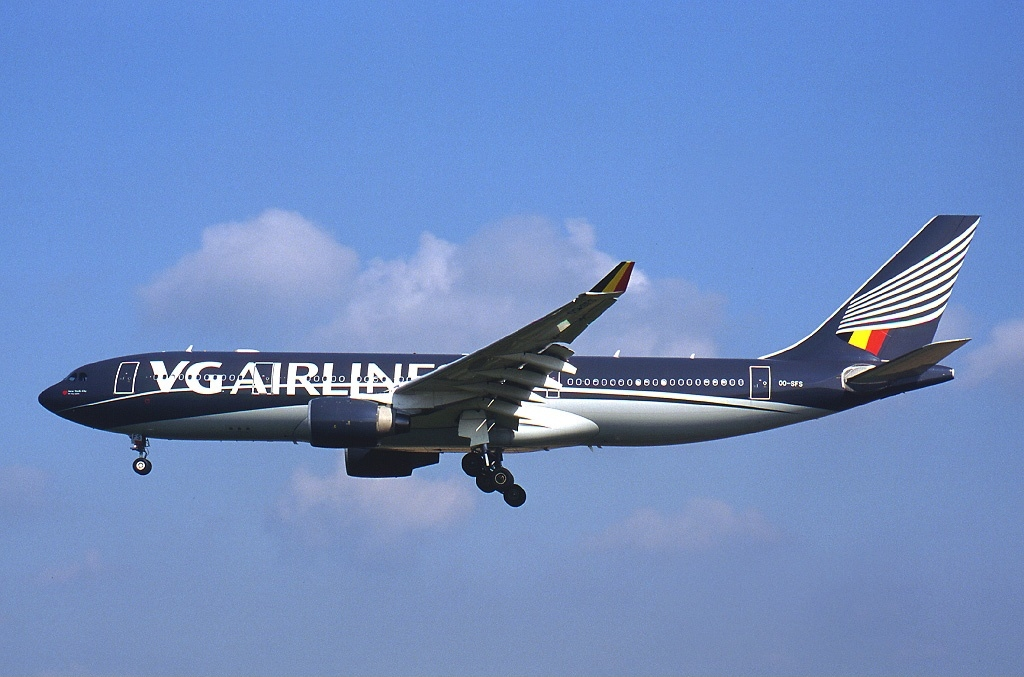
- Airbus A330-200
IATA	ICAO	Call sign
IV	FVG	NICO
- Founded: 2001
- Commenced operations: 24 May 2002
- Ceased operations: 5 November 2002
- Hubs: Brussels Airport
- Fleet size: At time of bankruptcy: 3
- Destinations: At time of bankruptcy: 3
- Headquarters: Merksem, Antwerp, Belgium
- Website: vgair.be

VG Airlines, renamed Delsey Airlines on August 8, 2002, (airline code IV, later assigned to Windjet) was a short-lived airline with its head office in Merksem, Antwerp, Belgium.

== History ==
VG Airlines was founded in 2001 to operate flights from Belgium to North America in the wake of Sabena's bankruptcy. The airline was renamed Delsey Airlines, (named after Delsey Suitcases) but it ceased operations on November 5. The pencil dark and light grey aircraft livery design with the feathered Belgian flag on the tailfin of VG Airlines was created by Lila Design in the Netherlands as well as the Delsey Airlines aircraft paint concept.

== Destinations ==
The airline operated flights from Brussels to Boston, Los Angeles, and New York–JFK in the United States.

== Fleet ==
Aircraft	In fleet
Airbus A330-200	3
