= Birdy Airlines =

Airline of Belgium (2002–2004)

Birdy Airlines S.A.
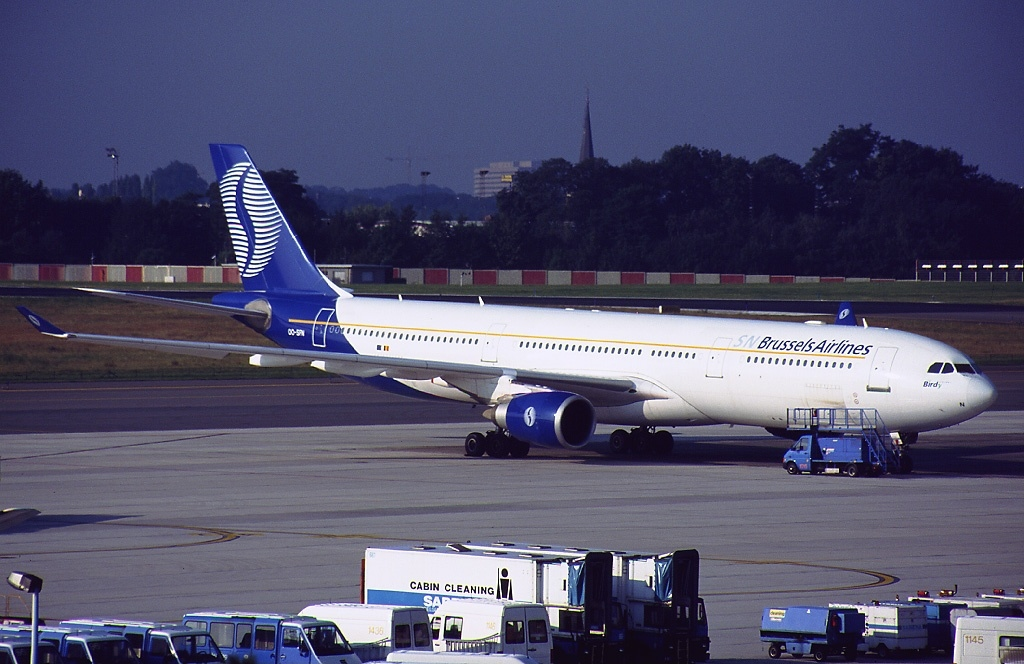
- An Airbus A330-300 operated on behalf of SN Brussels Airlines.
IATA	ICAO	Call sign
4V	BDY	BEL-BIRD
- Founded: March 2002
- Commenced operations: 26 April 2002
- Ceased operations: 27 October 2004 (merged into SN Brussels Airlines)
- Hubs: Brussels Airport
- Headquarters: Brussels, Belgium
- Key people: Victor Hasson; Georges Gutelman

Birdy Airlines was an airline based in Belgium that performed long-haul flights from Brussels to Africa on behalf of SN Brussels Airlines using a fleet of three Airbus A330-300 aircraft. The airline was founded in March 2002 and started operations on the following 26 April. It ceased its operations on 27 October 2004 and was merged into SN Brussels Airlines.
