= Sobelair =

Charter airline of Belgium (1946–2004)

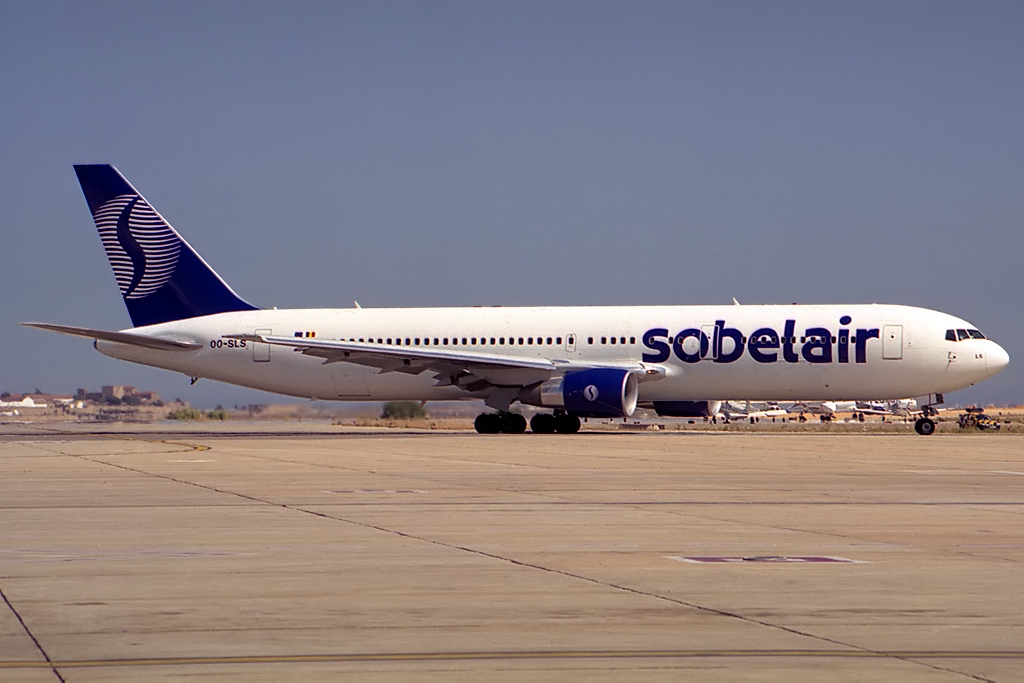
- Boeing 767-300ER
IATA	ICAO	Call sign
Q7	SLR	SOBELAIR
- Founded: 30 July 1946
- Commenced operations: 15 October 1946
- Ceased operations: 19 January 2004
- Operating bases: Brussels Airport
- Parent company: Sabena (1949–2001); SN Brussels Airlines (2002–2004)

Société Belge des Transports par Air SA, known by its short form Sobelair, was a Belgian charter airline that operated from 1946 to 2004. It was headquartered in Brussels (later in Zaventem) and operated mostly non-scheduled passenger and cargo flights out of Brussels Airport.

== History ==
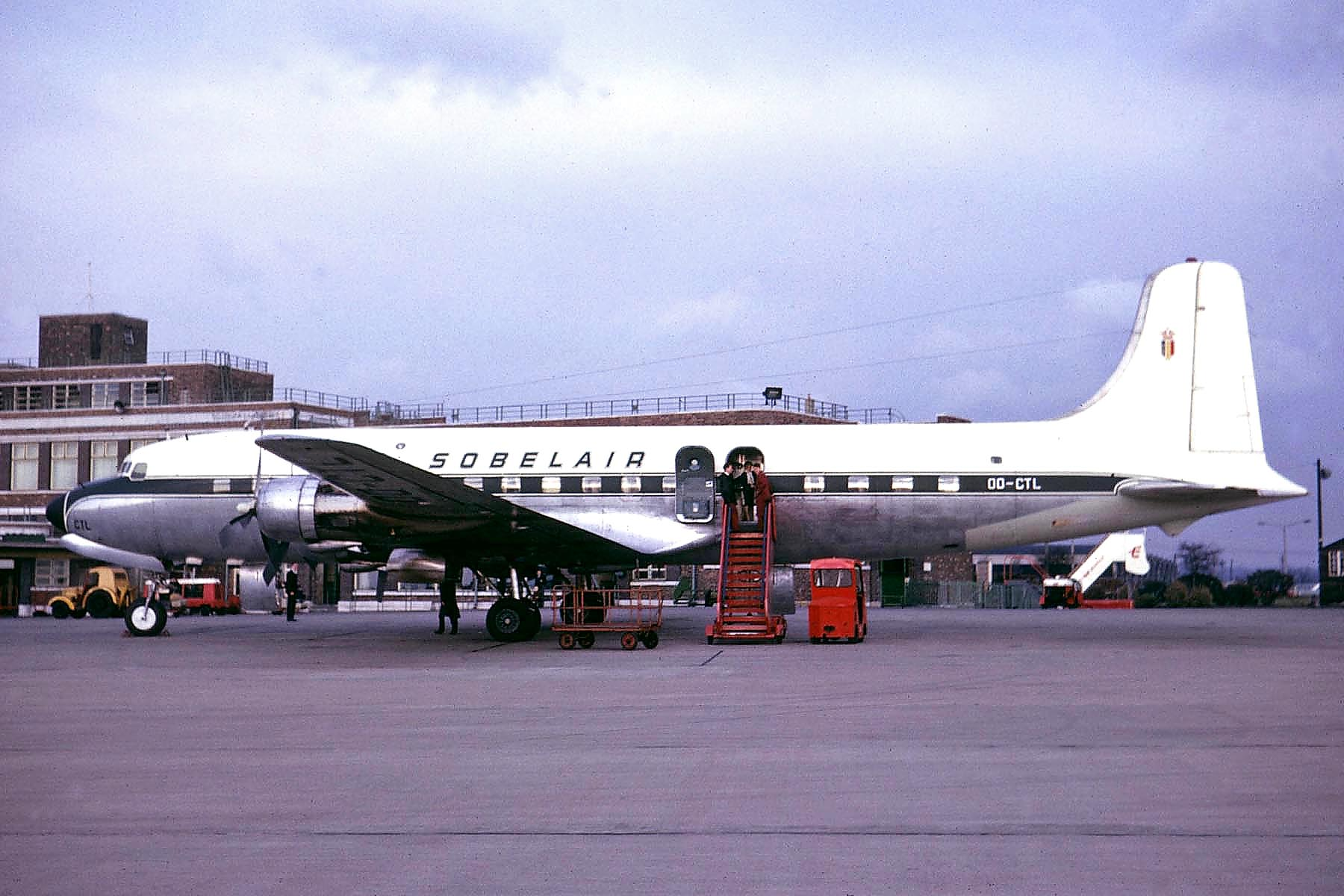
Douglas DC-6.

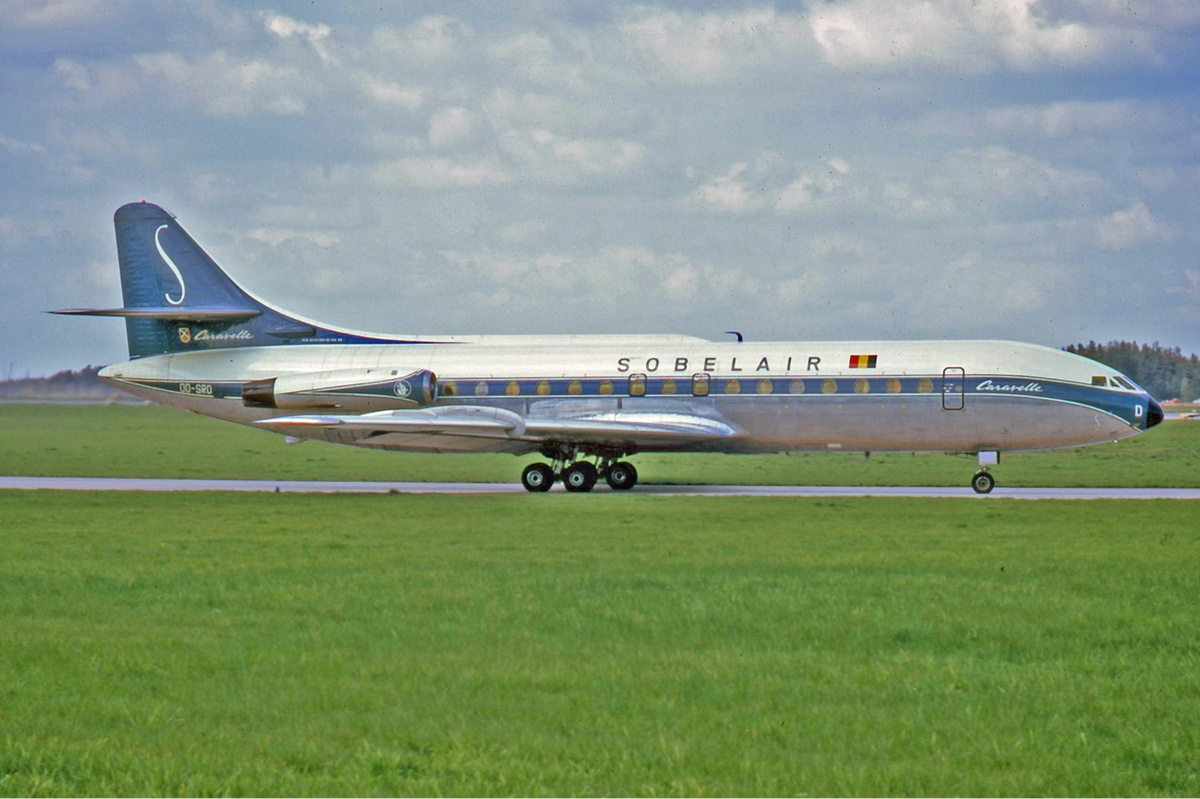
A Sud Aviation SE-210 Caravelle at Hannover Airport in 1972.

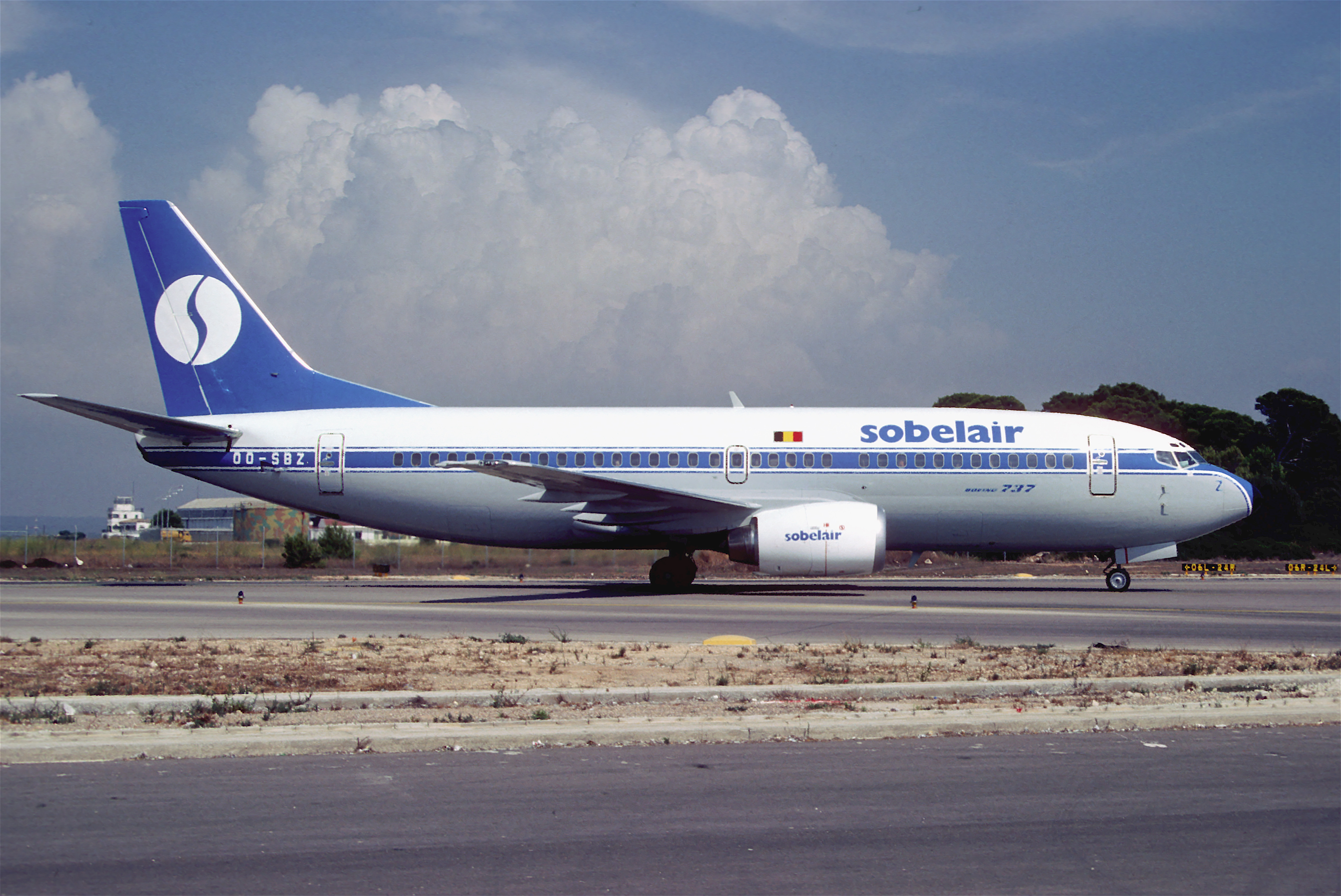
A Boeing 737-300 in 1987.

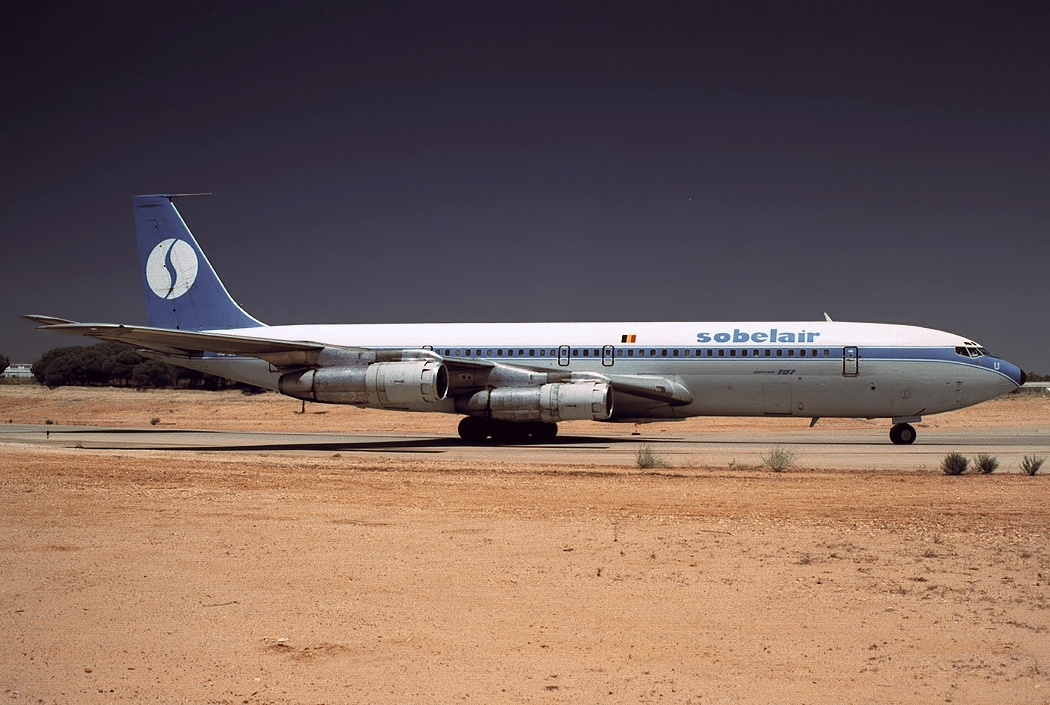
A Boeing 707s at Faro Airport in 1989.

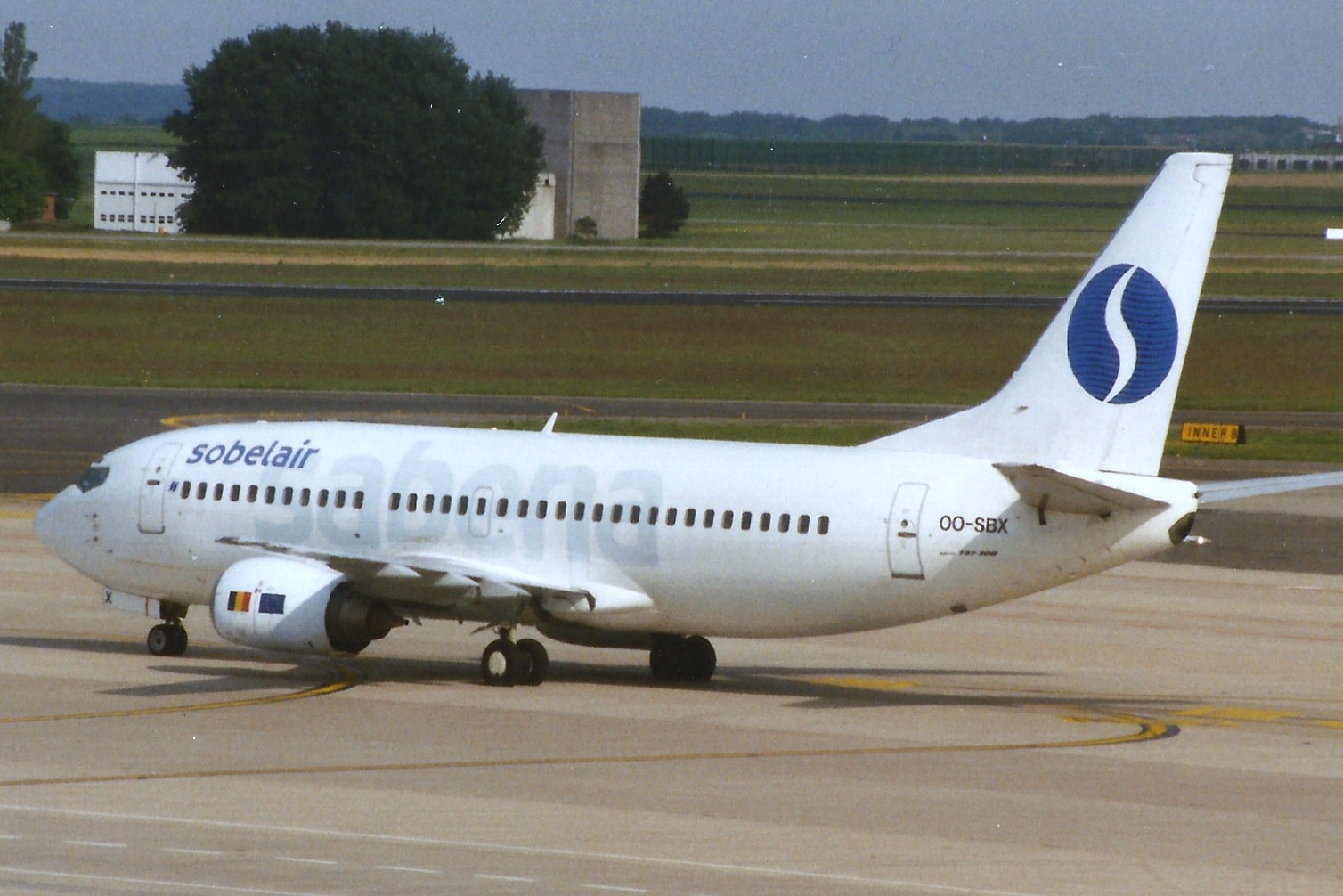
A Boeing 737-300 in SABENA style colours.

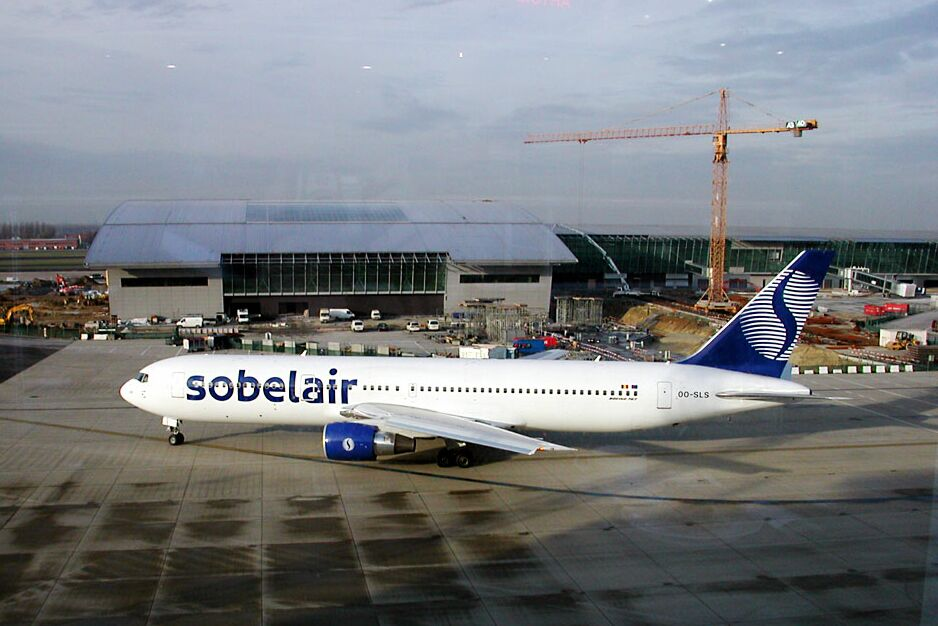
A Boeing 767-300 at Brussels Airport in 2001, featuring the last corporate livery.

Sobelair was founded as a charter airline on 30 July 1946, originally as Société d'Etude et de Transports Aériens (SETA). The first revenue flight using a Douglas DC-3 aircraft, which took place on 15 October of that year, was a flowers transport to Nice via Paris. In 1947, scheduled flights from Brussels to Elisabethville in Belgian Congo were launched on behalf of several companies in the Belgian colony, which held the majority of the stakes in the company. In 1949, these shares were acquired by Belgian flag carrier Sabena, which thus owned 72.29% in Sobelair.

When Republic of the Congo (Léopoldville) was founded as an independent state in the former Belgian Congo, Sobelair ceased its African service, and concentrated on offering chartered holiday flights to the Mediterranean instead, as well as (between 1957 and 1962) domestic routes using small Cessna 310 airplanes.

Sobelair joined the jet age in 1971, when the first Caravelle was acquired second-hand from Sabena. Over the following years, the fleet was further modernized with Boeing 707 aircraft, which stayed until 1988. By then, Sobelair operated a fleet composed exclusively of smaller Boeing 737 airliners. Long haul flights were relaunched only in 1994, using a newly bought Boeing 767-300.

When Swissair started an alliance with Sabena in 1995, plans were made for a co-operation of the respective charter subsidiaries. Thus, Sobelair went into negotiation with the Swiss subsidiary of Trans European Airways in 1996, which turned out to be fruitless. Instead, an agreement was signed with Crossair. In 1997, Sobelair operated chartered passenger flights from Zürich to San Francisco and Las Vegas on behalf of Swissair. In the late 1990s, a charter contract with tour operator Jetair was signed. In 2001, further agreements with ALM Antillean Airlines and Balair were secured.

In October 2001, Swissair went bankrupt, which was followed by the demise of partner Sabena in November of the same year, which led to the future of Sobelair becoming uncertain, too. Delta Air Transport, which the Sabena landing slot had been transferred to, briefly considered taking over Sobelair's 767s for the re-launch of scheduled passenger flights to Africa (instead, Birdy Airlines was founded for that purpose), and German tour operator Preussag went into negotiations concerning a taking-over of the airline, which were dropped again in February 2002.

After having been acquired by a group of investors in June 2002, which led to the launch of scheduled flights on the Brussels-Johannesburg route, Sobelair was passed on to SN Brussels Airlines in early 2003, for which it operated charter flights henceforth. This did not lead to an improvement of the financial situation, and Sobelair declared bankruptcy in early January 2004. TUI Travel placed an offer for taking over Sobelair's aircraft in order to create a Belgian airline subsidiary, provided that creditor protection would be granted. On 19 January, this measure was rejected, so that Sobelair went out of business and its then approximately 450 employees lost their jobs.

== Fleet ==
Over the nearly 60 years of its existence, Sobelair operated the following aircraft types:

Sobelair fleet
Aircraft	Introduced	Retired	Number at closure	Notes
Airbus A300B4	1993	1999	—	
Airbus A320-200	2000	2000	1	Leased from TransAer International Airlines.
Boeing 707	1974	1989	—	
Boeing 720			—	
Boeing 727	1995	1996	—	
Boeing 737-200	1978	1997	—	
Boeing 737-300	1987	2004	3	
Boeing 737-400	1990	2004	4	
Boeing 737-800	2002	2004	2	
Boeing 767-300ER	1994	2004	5	
Cessna 310	1957	1961	—	
Douglas DC-3	1946		—	
Douglas DC-4	1947	1961	—	
Douglas DC-6	1961	1970	—	
Fokker F27 Friendship	1968	1971	—	
McDonnell Douglas DC-10-30	1994	1994	—	
McDonnell Douglas MD-83	1994	1994	—	
Sud Aviation Caravelle	1971	1978	—	

== Accidents and incidents ==
- Sobelair suffered one fatal accident, which occurred on 22 April 1960. A Douglas C-54 Skymaster of the airline, registered OO-SBL, crashed into a mountain slope (a so-called controlled flight into terrain) whilst approaching an airfield in Bunia, then Belgian Congo. All 28 passengers and the seven crew members that had been on the chartered flight from Cairo died.
- On 20 December 1970, a Sobelair Douglas DC-6 (registered OO-CTL) was damaged beyond repair when it ran off the runway at Málaga Airport. The cargo flight with seven occupants had had to perform an emergency landing at the airport in bad weather conditions because the left main landing gear could not be extended due to a hydraulic problem.
- On 29 March 1981, an engine fire occurred with a Sobelair Boeing 707 (registered OO-SJA) shortly after take-off from Brussels Airport. The pilots returned to the airport and had to execute an emergency landing. As there had not been time to dump fuel, the airplane was too heavy, and was deliberately steered off the runway in order not to overshoot it, during which it suffered extensive damage. The 109 passengers and eight crew members survived the accident.
