= Georges Gutelman =

Belgian engineer and businessman (1938–2019)

- Born: 6 December 1938; Liège, Belgium
- Died: 5 November 2019 (aged 80); Israel
- Occupations: Businessman; Engineer

Georges Gutelman (6 December 1938 – 5 November 2019) was a Polish-born Belgian engineer and businessman who specialized in aviation.

== Biography ==
Gutelman was born in 1938 to Polish-Jewish émigrés parents. During World War II, his mother was murdered by the Nazis in Auschwitz, while he hid with his father in Belgium. Gutelman graduated from the University of Liège in 1963 and shortly thereafter started a travel agency and bought his first plane with his childhood friend, Jean Gol.

In 1971, Gutelman founded the charter airline Trans European Airways. In 1984 and 1985, Gutelman used his business to help with Operation Moses, an operation that helped evacuate Ethiopian Jews from Sudan into Israel during famine and civil war. In 1989, Gutelman was elected as businessman of the year by the Belgian magazine Trends.

Trans European Airways filed for bankruptcy in 1994, but the company was relaunched the following year as European Airlines, and later Eurobelgian Airlines. Eurobelgian Airlines was later bought by Richard Branson and renamed Virgin Express. After this, Gutelman partnered with Victor Hasson to start the airline CityBird, which went bankrupt after five years, in 2001. He founded Birdy Airlines in 2002, which ceased operations in 2004 after being bought by SN Brussels Airlines. That same year, Gutelman was arrested for financial fraud, but released a day later.

Gutelman took a minority stake in Alma Telecom in 2006 with Albert Hasson, the brother of Victor Hasson who had died a year earlier. Gutelman had hopes of bringing the mobile phone to the African community.

Georges Gutelman died on 5 November 2019.
