= Melsbroek Air Base =

Air Base in Brsussels

Melsbroek Air Base (Advanced Landing Ground B-58)
- Melsbroek Air Base in 2019
- IATA: none; ICAO: EBMB

Summary
- Airport type: Military
- Operator: Belgian Air Force
- Serves: Brussels
- Location: Steenokkerzeel
- Elevation AMSL: 184 ft (56 m)
- Coordinates: 50°54′05″N 004°29′04″E

Map
- Location in Belgium

Runways
Direction	Length		Surface
Direction	m	ft	Surface
01/19	2,987	9,800	Asphalt
07R/25L	3,211	10,535	Asphalt
07L/25R	3,638	11,936	Asphalt

Melsbroek Air Base (ICAO: EBMB) is a Belgian Air Force facility in Steenokkerzeel, 12 km (7 miles) northeast of Brussels, the capital of Belgium. It is located on the northern side of Brussels Airport, with which it shares runways and ground and air control facilities.

The 15th Air Transport Wing operates from Melsbroek Air Base with following types:

- Airbus A310 (retired)
- Airbus A330 (retired)
- Airbus A321
- Dassault Falcon 20
- Dassault Falcon 900
- Dassault Falcon 7x
- Embraer 135 & 145
- Lockheed C-130 (retired)
- Airbus A400M Atlas

== History ==
The aerodrome was constructed by the German Wehrmacht during World War II. After the 1944 liberation of Belgium, Melsbroek was operated by the Royal Canadian Air Force and the Royal Air Force when it was known as B58 Melsbroek.

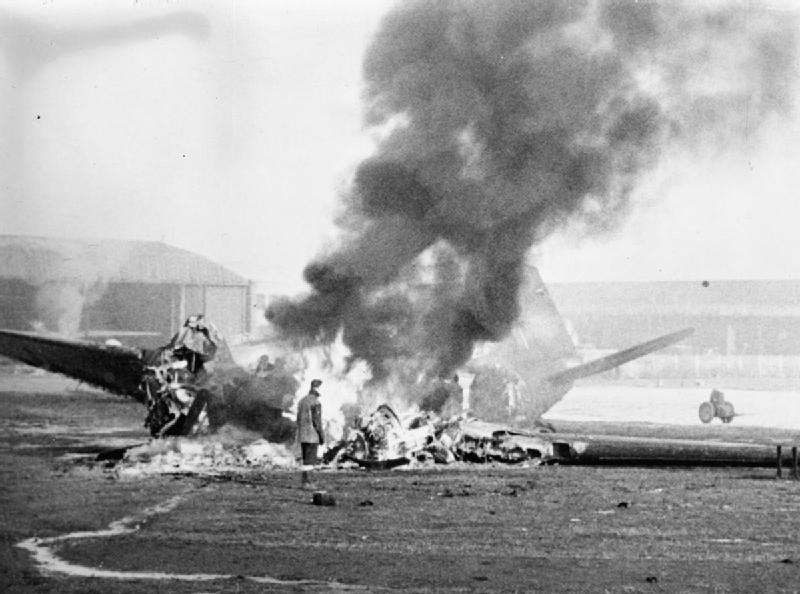
Douglas Dakota destroyed at Melsbroek during Operation Bodenplatte

Operation Bodenplatte, the German aerial attack of 1 January 1945, hit Melsbroek hard. According to Emil Clade (leading III./JG 27), the AAA positions were not manned, and aircraft were bunched together or in lines, which made perfect targets. The attack caused considerable damage among the units based there. The Recce Wings had lost two entire squadrons worth of machines. No. 69 Squadron RAF lost 11 Vickers Wellingtons and two damaged. Possibly all No. 140 Squadron RAF′s de Havilland Mosquito aircraft were lost. At least five Supermarine Spitfires from No. 16 Squadron RAF were destroyed. No. 271 Squadron RAF lost at least seven Handley Page Harrow transports "out of action". A further 15 other aircraft were destroyed. 139 Wing reported five North American B-25 Mitchell bombers destroyed and five damaged. Some 15 to 20 United States Army Air Forces (USAAF) bombers were also destroyed. Another source states that 13 Wellingtons were destroyed, as were five Mosquitoes, four Austers and five Avro Ansons from the Tactical Air Forces 2nd Communications Squadron. Three Spitfires were also lost and two damaged. At least one RAF Transport Command Douglas Dakota was destroyed.

After the war, Melsbroek replaced Haren Airfield as the Belgian national airport. That title is now carried by the Zaventem terminal on the same aerodrome, built for the 1958 world exposition. At that time, the existing terminal was taken over by the then Belgian Air Force.

When Trans European Airways existed, its head office was in Building 117 of Melsbroek Airport. When CityBird existed its head office was in Building 117D.
