= Orion Airways =

Charter airline of the United Kingdom (1979–1989)

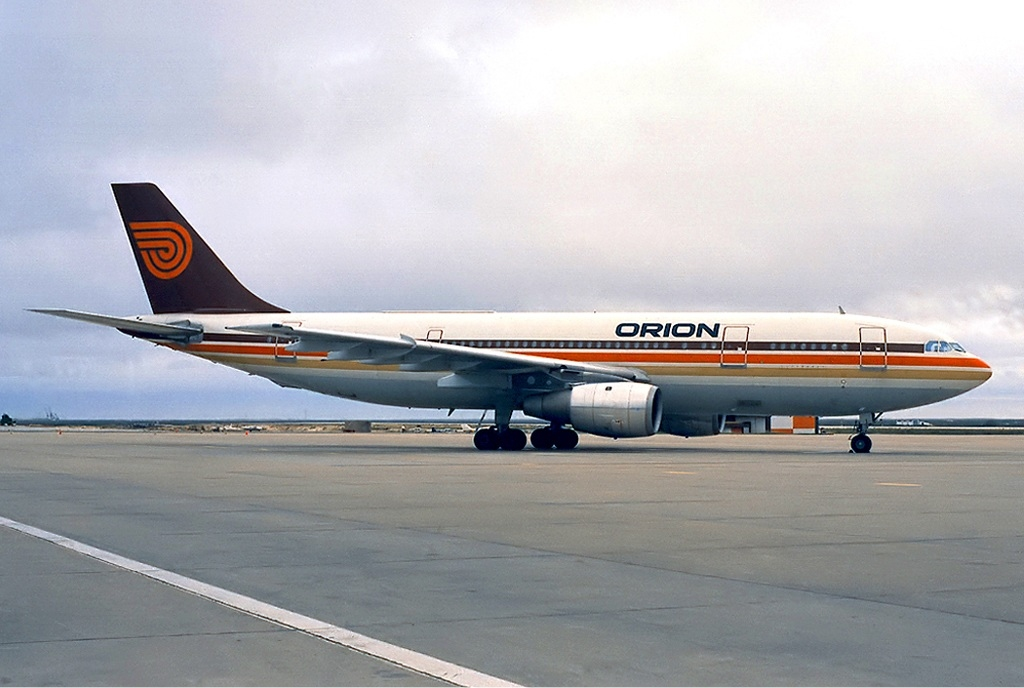
- Airbus A300 at Faro Airport (Portugal) in 1987
IATA	ICAO	Call sign
KG	ORN	ORION
- Founded: 28 November 1978
- Commenced operations: 1 April 1980
- Ceased operations: 1989 (merged into Britannia Airways)
- Operating bases: Birmingham; East Midlands; London–Gatwick; Manchester
- Fleet size: 21
- Destinations: charter
- Parent company: Horizon Travel
- Headquarters: East Midlands Airport, Castle Donington, North West Leicestershire, England

Orion Airways Ltd. (known simply as 'Orion') was an airline based in the United Kingdom with its head office at East Midlands Airport in Castle Donington. It was established as the charter airline of Horizon Travel and in 1986 went on to develop scheduled services. The airline operated a fleet of Boeing 737-200s, Boeing 737-300s and Airbus A300s between 1979 and 1989. At the beginning of 1989 it merged into Britannia Airways.

== History ==
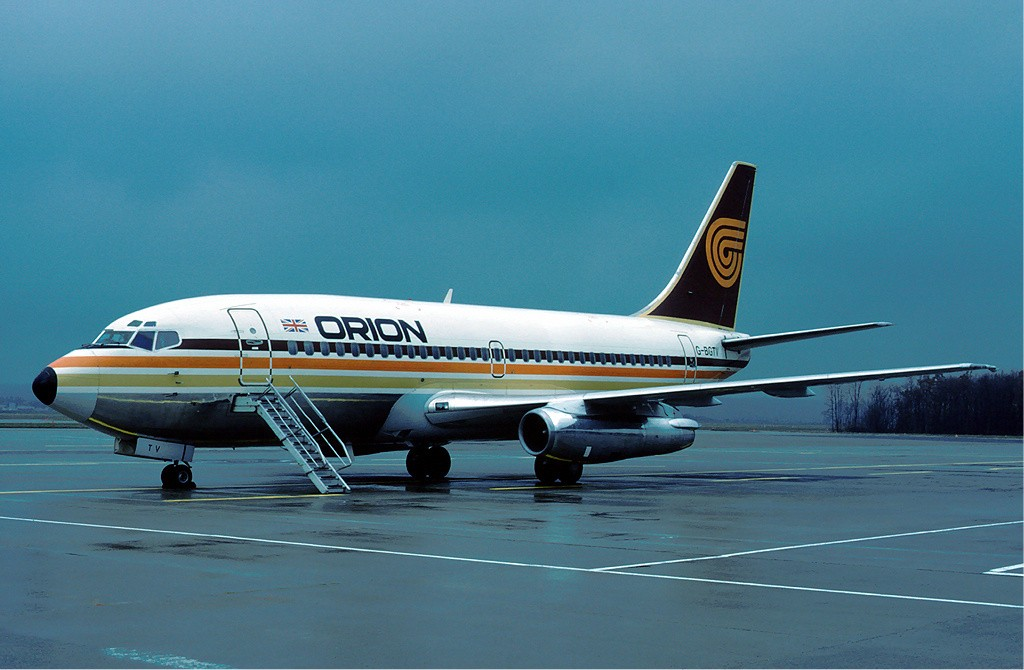
Boeing 737-200 at Basel Airport in April 1984

Horizon Travel established Orion in late 1978 to support its package holiday business at a time when there was a shortage in capacity provided by charter airlines. Orion began operation with three Boeing 737-200s on 28 March 1980.

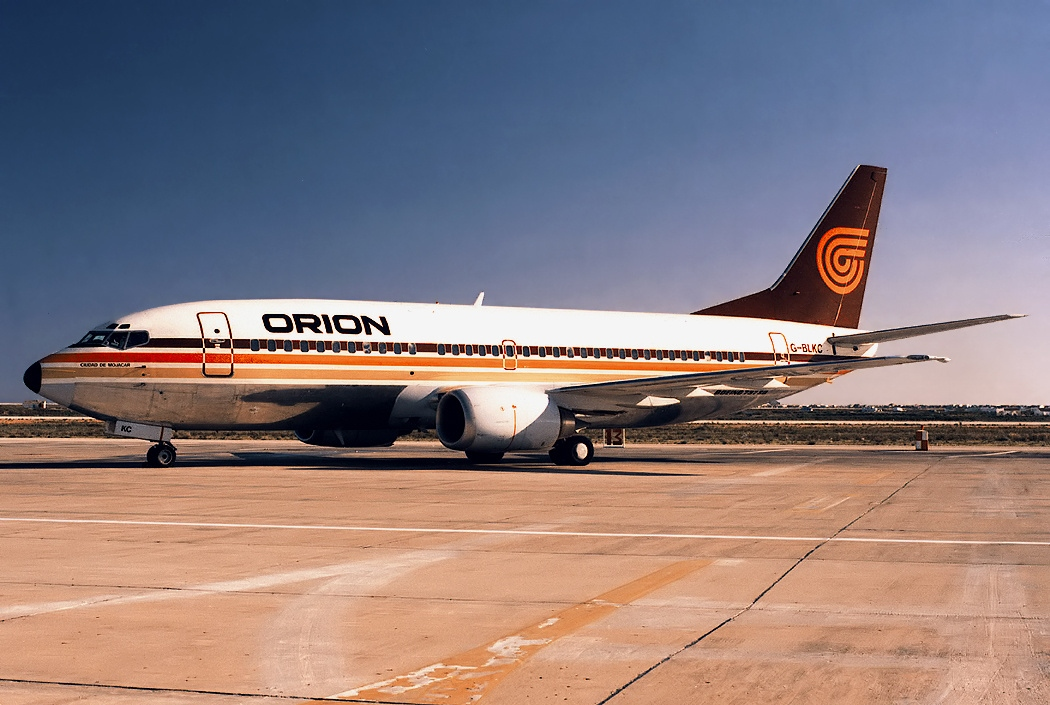
Boeing 737-300

Over the next few years, Orion gradually expanded its fleet, operating 11 737-200s by the summer of 1984, and from 1985, beginning to replace them by more modern Boeing 737-300s. From 1984, the airline began to diversify, taking on charter work from other tour operators, while in 1986, Orion received permission to fly scheduled services from East Midlands Airport and Birmingham Airport to various holiday destinations. These were started on 4 September.

The airline quickly won a reputation for its quality of service, punctuality, and distinctive look. The competition was fierce but Horizon's destinations continued to increase, correlating with Orion's increased route-network and fleet growth. In 1987, the Horizon group, including Orion was bought by Bass, the large brewing and hotels group. As a successful holiday tour operator and integrated airline it was an appealing, tidy, and importantly a 'no-strings' package ripe for sale to a competitor. In 1988, Bass accepted an offer from the ever-expanding Thomson Travel Group. When the news was released that Orion was to be integrated into Britannia during 1989, it came as a surprise to the industry and public alike.

The last flight took place on 26 January 1989 and it was not long before the familiar livery and titles disappeared from aircraft and buildings at East Midlands Airport because the new owner understandably intended to concentrate its activities at its Luton Airport base. Naturally, the scheduled licenses were transferred to Britannia without interruption, but at the end of the 1990 summer season, the airline decided to withdraw from this market in favour of its charter work.

In the meantime, the previous management of Orion had formed TEA UK in association with TEA (Trans European Airways of Belgium). Under the takeover agreement, they were not allowed to base any operations at East Midlands Airport so they choose nearby Birmingham Airport although the airline went on to establish a relatively large presence at East Midlands Airport.

== See also ==
- List of defunct airlines of the United Kingdom
