= Trans European Airways =

Belgian airline

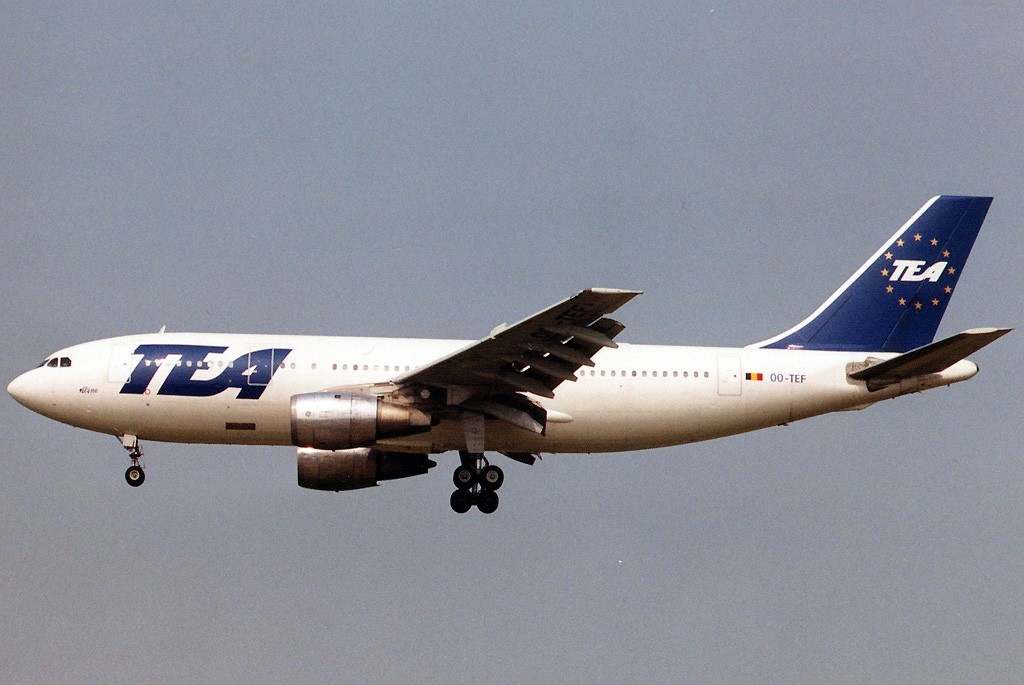
- Airbus A300B4
IATA	ICAO	Call sign
HE	TEA	BELGAIR
- Founded: October 1970
- Commenced operations: 1971
- Ceased operations: September 27, 1991 (renamed EuroBelgian Airlines)
- Hubs: Brussels Airport
- Headquarters: Steenokkerzeel, Belgium
- Key people: George P. Gutelman (founder and CEO)

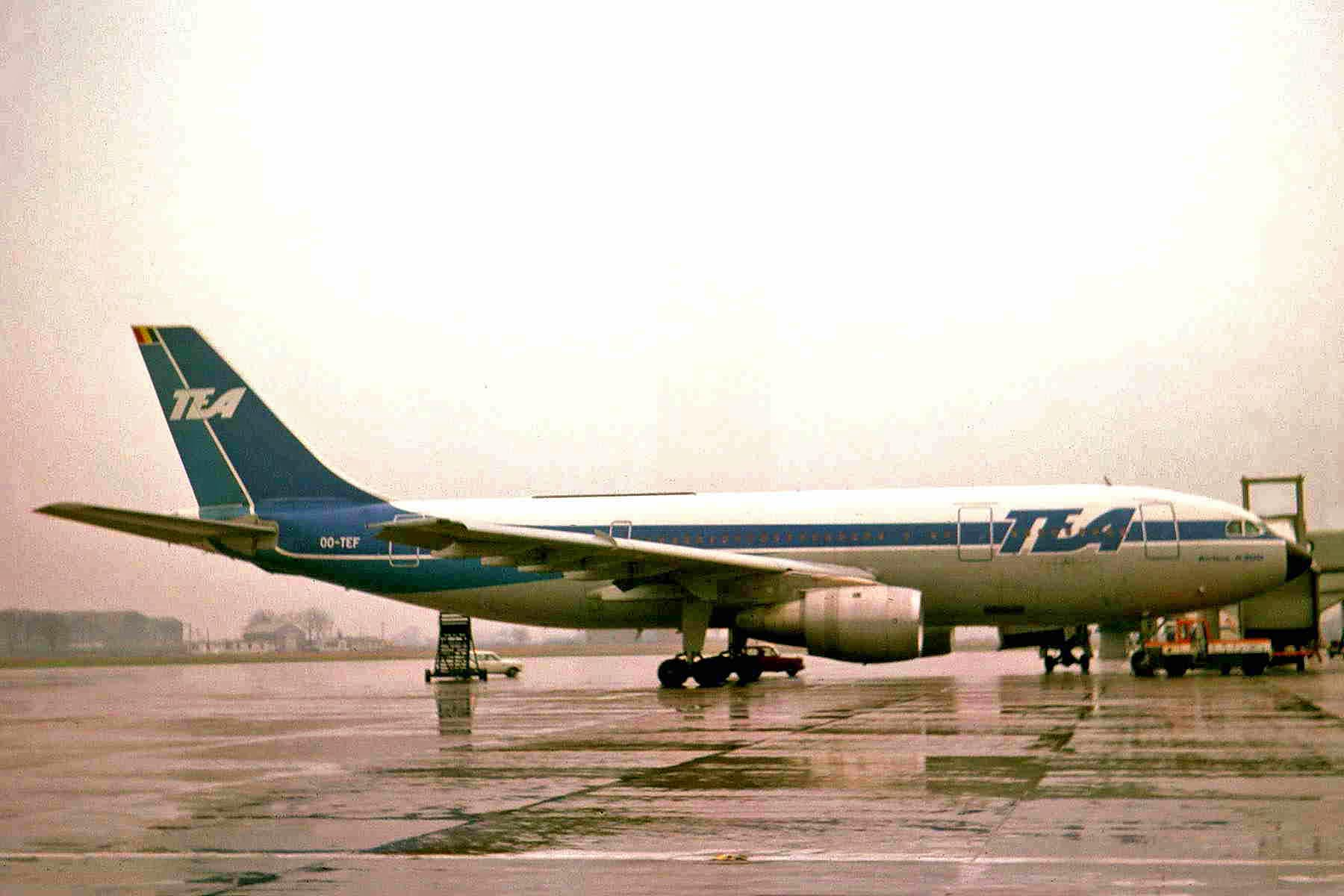
Airbus A300B1

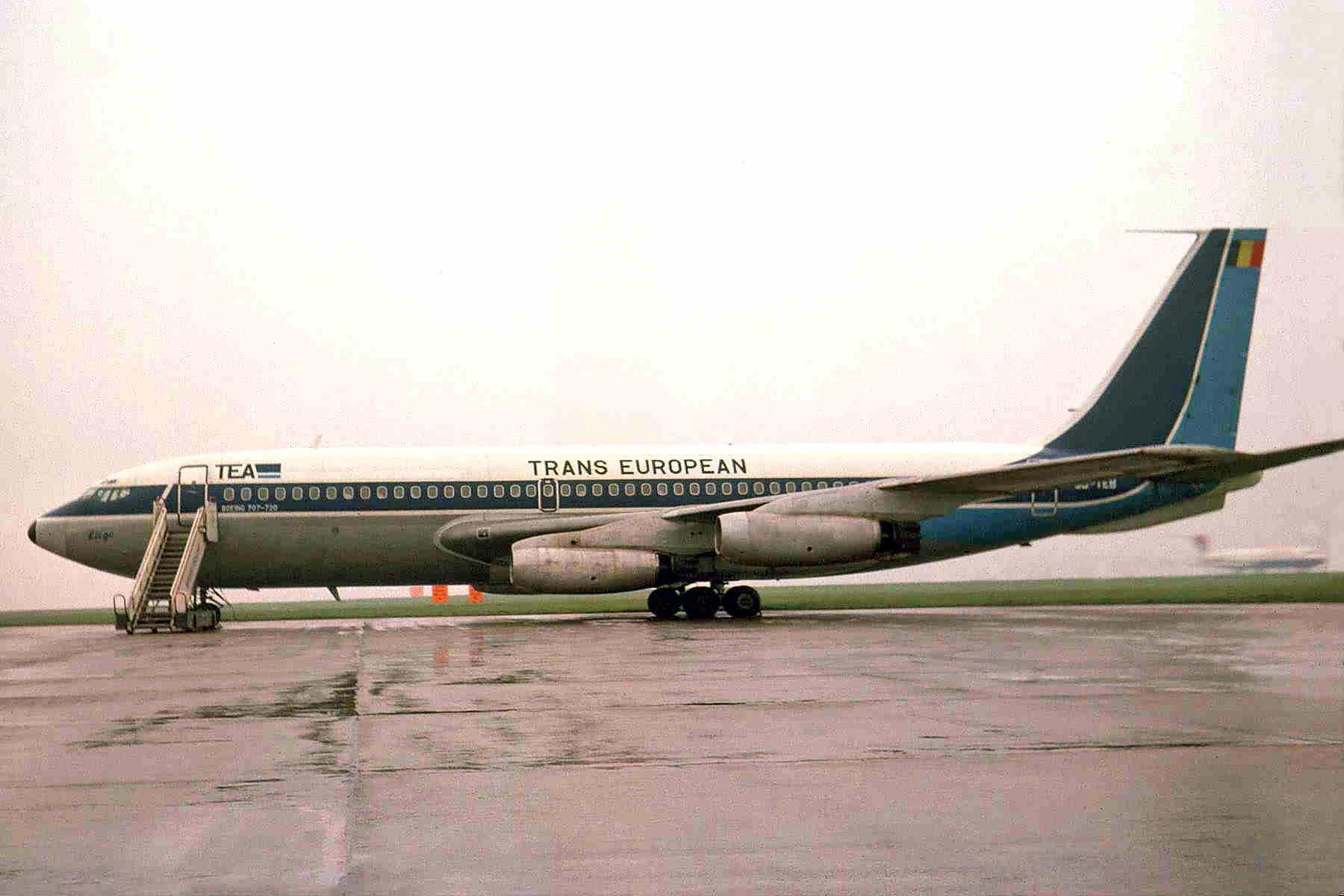
Boeing 720

Trans European Airways, usually referred to by its initials TEA, was a Belgian airline that operated from 1971 to 1991. It had its head office in Building 117 on the grounds of Melsbroek Airport in Steenokkerzeel, Belgium.

== History ==
TEA was founded in October 1970 by the Belgian tour operator TIFA and George P. Gutelman. In Spring 1971 inclusive tour flights commenced with a used Boeing 720. The airline initially acquired a fleet of second-hand Boeing 707 and Boeing 720 aircraft.

In the early 1970s TEA became the first airline to order an Airbus and subsequently operated the only Airbus A300B1 variant to be used in public service - distinguished by its shorter fuselage and lack of slats - until its retirement in November 1990.

The airline expanded, operating a second Airbus A300 for a while and started to acquire Boeing 737-200 aircraft. It later acquired Belgian tour operator SunSnacks, which it had helped to form in 1976, and created a subsidiary, TEAMCO (Trans European Airways Maintenance Company) to handle maintenance of its own aircraft and those of other operators, both civil and military.

The company was involved in Operation Moses in 1984-1985, and then started to expand rapidly during the late 1980s, forming subsidiaries in the United Kingdom (TEA-UK), France (TEA-FRANCE), Italy (TEA-ITALY) and Switzerland (TEA-BASEL). A handful of schedules were launched on June 10, 1990, but the global economic downturn in the early nineties, partly as a result of the Gulf War, caused it to go out of business on 27 September 1991. All operations were stopped on November of that same year.

Following its failure, parts of the group gave life to new airlines: European Airlines and EuroBelgian Airlines (later on Virgin Express) were formed, and the management of the UK subsidiary, who had previously managed Orion Airways went on to form Excalibur Airways. TEA Switzerland continued to trade successfully, and was eventually purchased by easyJet in 1997 and became easyJet Switzerland. Georges Gutelman later went on to found CityBird, which also failed in the aviation slump that followed the September 11 attacks in 2001.

== Fleet ==
The airline operated the following aircraft types at various times in its existence:

- Airbus A300B1
- Airbus A300B4
- Airbus A310-300
- Boeing 707-120
- Boeing 707-320
- Boeing 720
- Boeing 737-200
- Boeing 737-300
- Bristol Wayfarer
- Lockheed L-049 Constellation
