= Victor Hasson =

- Born: 11 October 1957; Usumbura, Ruanda-Urundi
- Died: 6 January 2005 (aged 47); Brussels, Belgium

Victor Hasson (11 October 1957 – 6 January 2005) was a Belgian businessman who started multiple companies.

== Career ==
Victor Hasson, also known as "Vico", was born in Usumbura, Burundi. He graduated from the Université libre de Bruxelles with a degree in medicine. After graduating, Hasson quickly realized that medicine was not for him and decided to join his family's business.

=== CityHotel ===
Created by his uncles and managed by Victor and his brother Albert, the Hasson's most successful business was the City Hotel group. The company was later sold to the KBC Group.

=== European Belgian Airline (EBA) ===
Hasson started the European Belgian Airline, a low-cost company built off of the old market share from Trans European Airways. It was later resold to Virgin Group (with chairman Richard Branson) who created Virgin Express.

=== City Bird ===
In 1996, he created the low cost airline Citybird, which company filed for bankruptcy in 2001.

=== Birdy ===
After Citybird, he started the Birdy company, reselling it to SN Brussels Airlines in 2004.

== Death ==
He died early 2005 at the age of 47 from esophageal cancer.
