= CityBird =

Belgian charter airline

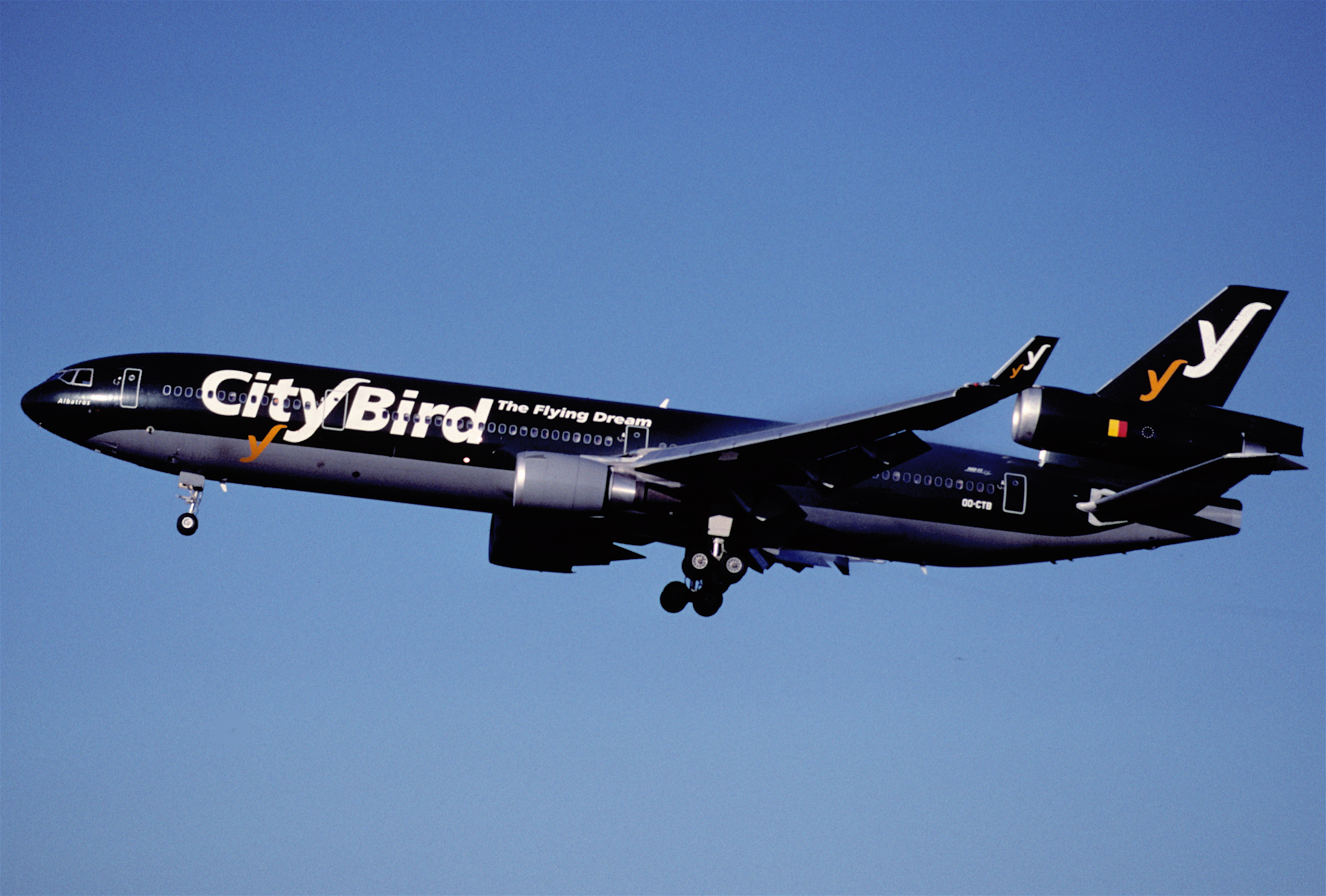
- McDonnell Douglas MD-11
IATA	ICAO	Call sign
H2	CTB	DREAM FLIGHT
- Founded: August 6, 1996
- Ceased operations: October 4, 2001
- Hubs: Brussels Airport
- Subsidiaries: CityBird France
- Fleet size: 16
- Destinations: +50
- Parent company: CityBird Holding S.A.
- Headquarters: Melsbroek Air Base, Zaventem, Belgium
- Key people: Victor Hasson (Chairman & CEO); Georges Gutelman
- Employees: +600 (2001)
- Website: Former website

CityBird S.A. was a Belgian airline, established in August 1996 and based in Building 117D, Melsbroek Air Base in Zaventem. Flight operations to various destinations were started in the month of December. Schedules were launched on March 27 of the following year.

CityBird flew a fleet of twelve aircraft including the Boeing 767-300ER, various Boeing 737 models, the Airbus A300-600R and the McDonnell Douglas MD-11. Over 50 European cities were served via Brussels. Citybird employed over 600 employees as of 2001 and was listed at NASDAQ Europe a.k.a. Eastdaq under the ticker symbol CBIR (CityBird holding SA) in November 1997. Though they had bought their first MD-11 in December 1996, they did not begin operations until March 1997.

Aircraft cabins had a "Royal Eagle" business class, "Premium Flamingo" class (not on Newark flights), and "Colibri" economy class. CityBird preferred a "point-to-point" network rather than the "hub and spoke": all transatlantic flights (from Los Angeles, Newark, Oakland, Miami, Orlando or Mexico City) went to Brussels Airport. All aircraft featured the airline's tagline, "The Flying Dream." In July 1999, CityBird began cargo activities using two A300-600 "full freighters."

However, the scheduled flights did not yield the hoped-for economic results and were discontinued in 2000. The airline stopped all flying in Summer 2001 and filed for bankruptcy on October 4. Thomas Cook Airlines Belgium considered buying them out of bankruptcy for around €10 million, but later pulled out.

== Destinations in the western hemisphere ==
The following destinations in the Western Hemisphere were served by CityBird from Brussels

=== North America ===
- Cuba
  - Varadero
- Mexico
  - Cancún
  - Mexico City
- United States
  - Las Vegas
  - Los Angeles
  - Miami
  - New York City (served via Newark Liberty International Airport)
  - Oakland (San Francisco was served via Oakland International Airport)
  - Orlando

=== South America ===
- Suriname
  - Paramaribo

CityBird also served over 50 destinations in Europe from Brussels.

== See also ==
- List of defunct airlines of Belgium
