= Brussels Airport =

International airport serving Brussels, Belgium

Brussels Airport Luchthaven Brussel Aéroport de Bruxelles Flughafen Brüssel

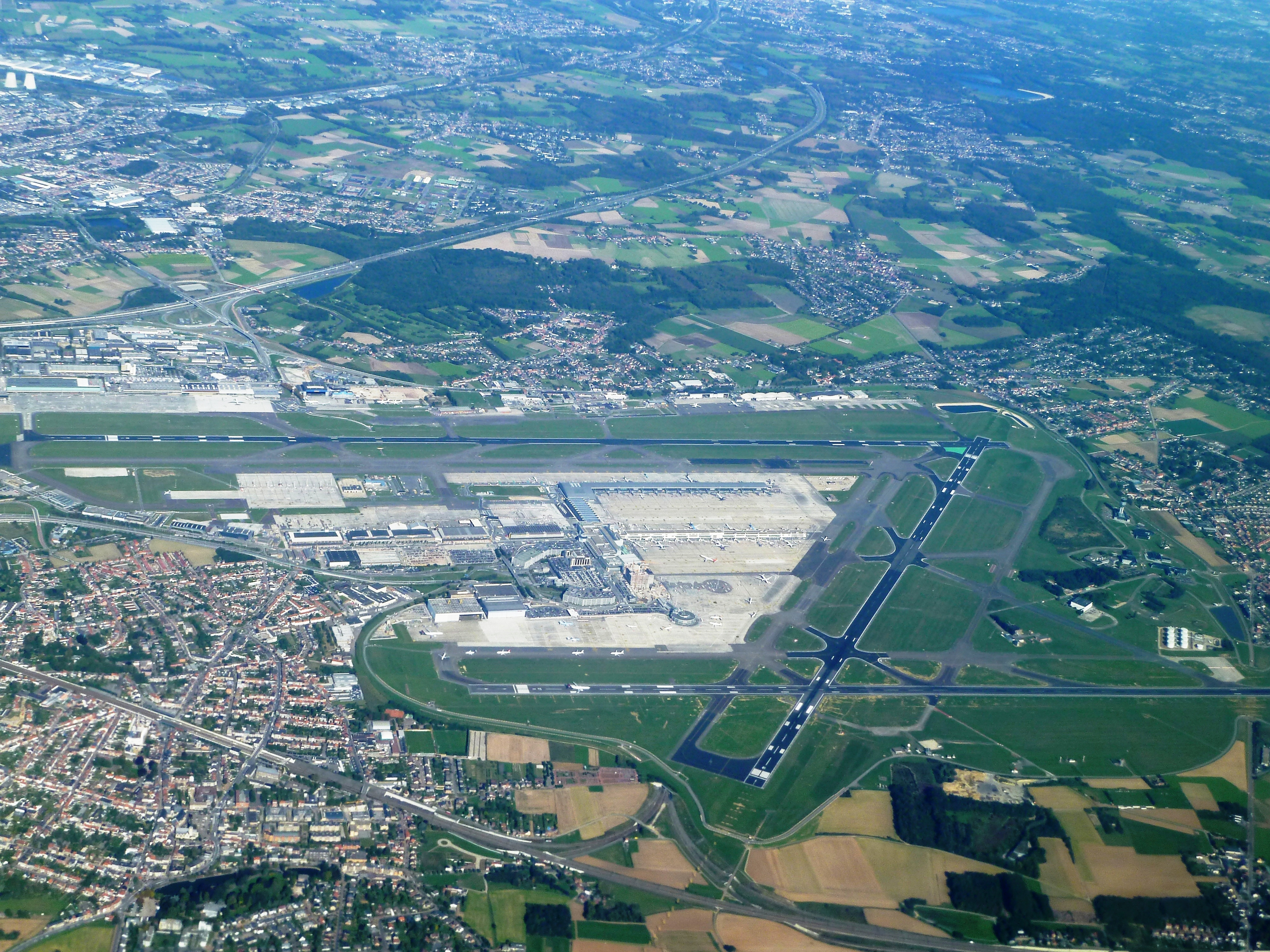
- IATA: BRU; ICAO: EBBR; WMO: 06451

Summary
- Airport type: Public / military
- Owner/Operator: Brussels Airport Company
- Serves: Brussels Capital Region; Flemish Brabant; Walloon Brabant
- Location: Zaventem, Flemish Brabant, Belgium
- Hub for: Air Belgium; Brussels Airlines; Singapore Airlines Cargo
- Focus city for: TUI fly Belgium
- Elevation AMSL: 175 ft (53 m)
- Coordinates: 50°54′05″N 004°29′04″E
- Website: www.brusselsairport.be/en

Maps
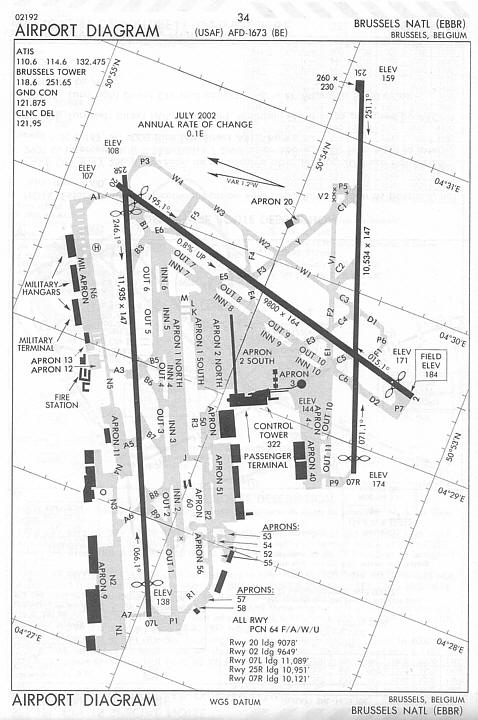
- Airport diagram

- Location in Belgium BRU/EBBR (Europe)

Runways
Direction	Length		Surface
Direction	m	ft	Surface
01/19	2,987	9,800	Asphalt
07R/25L	3,210	10,531	Asphalt
07L/25R	3,638	11,936	Asphalt

Statistics (2025)
- Passengers: 24,383,115
- Freight (tonnes): 795,271
- Aircraft movements: 198,370
- Sources: Brussels Airport, Belgian AIP

Brussels Airport (Note: Dutch: Luchthaven Brussel; French: Aéroport de Bruxelles; German: Flughafen Brüssel) (IATA: BRU, ICAO: EBBR) is the main international airport of Belgium. It is located in the municipality of Zaventem in Flemish Brabant, 12 km (7 miles) northeast of Brussels. Also informally known as Brussels-National Airport (Note: Dutch: Luchthaven Brussel-Nationaal; French: Aéroport de Bruxelles-National; German: Flughafen Brüssel-National) or Brussels-Zaventem Airport, (Note: Dutch: Luchthaven Brussel-Zaventem; French: Aéroport de Bruxelles-Zaventem; German: Flughafen Brüssel-Zaventem) Brussels Airport handled more than 26 million passengers in 2019, making it the 26th-busiest airport in Europe. It is home to around 260 companies, together directly employing 20,000 people and serves as the home base for Brussels Airlines and TUI fly Belgium. The airport covers 1,245 hectares (3,076 acres) and contains three runways.

On 22 March 2016, the airport's departures hall was severely damaged by two terrorist bomb blasts. The airport was closed until 3 April 2016, when it was reopened with temporary facilities at less than 20% of its previous capacity. It has since returned to full operations, with the same year record of 90,000 passengers on 19 July 2016. In 2019, the airport handled it's busiest day ever with 96,000 passengers on 2 August.

The airport is owned primarily by the Flemish and Belgian government, who own 39% and 25% respectively.

== History ==
=== Early years ===
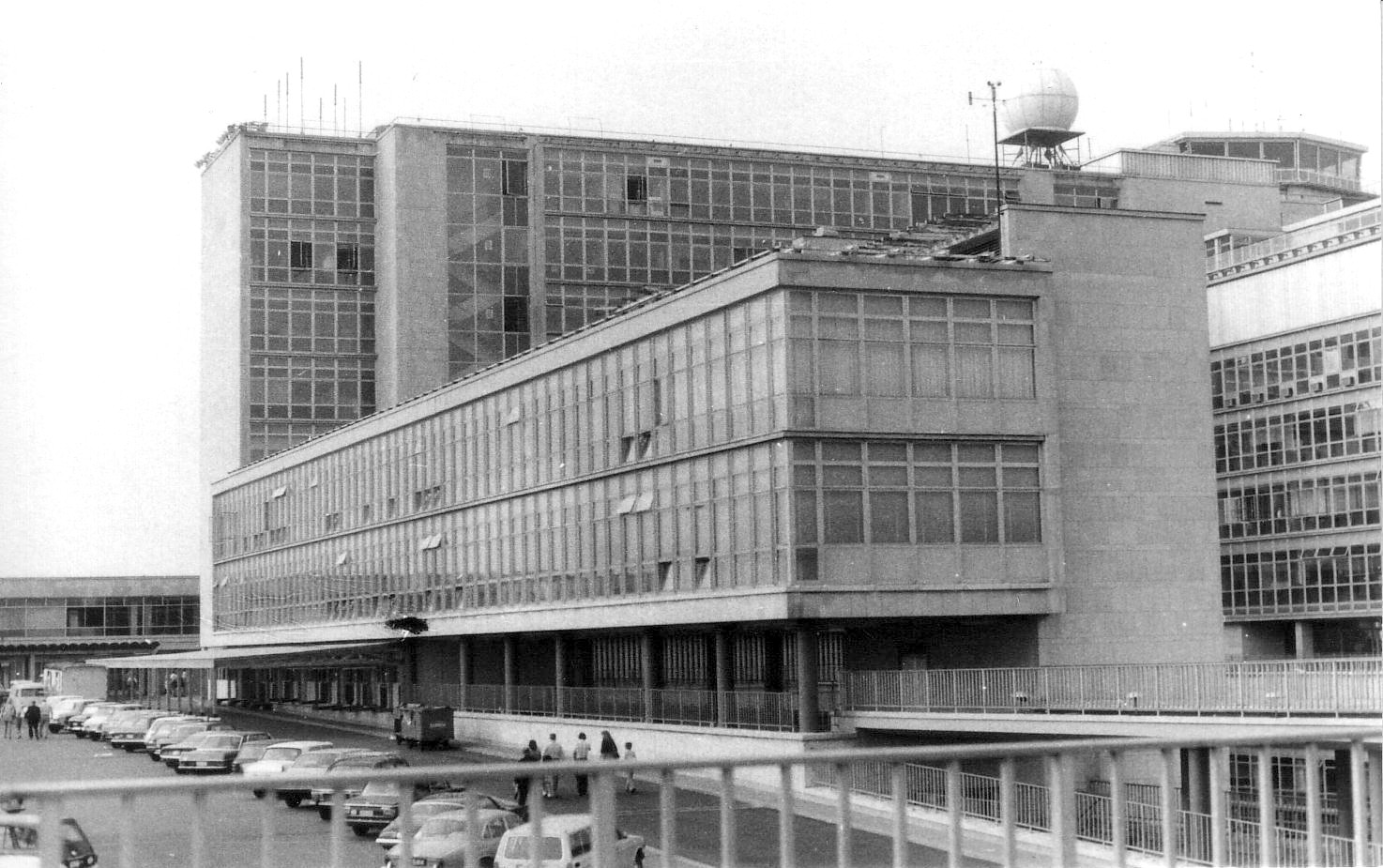
Terminal 58 at Brussels Airport, built for Expo 58 (pictured in 1974)

In 1956, a new 2,300 m (7,500 ft) runway was constructed, 07R/25L, which almost runs parallel with 07L/25R. The runway is still in use today and saw its length later increased to 3,200 m (10,500 ft). In April 1956, the Belgian government decided to build a new airport, using the same runways, but with the buildings located within the municipality of Zaventem. In April 1957, construction started of the new terminal, preparing the airport for the 1958 World's Fair (Expo 58). The grass runway 12/30 had to make way to allow for the new passenger terminal. This new airport was inaugurated on 5 July 1958, just in time for the 1958 World’s Fair. The buildings on the Melsbroek side are still in use by the Belgian Air Force (15th Air Transport Wing), and this is still known as Melsbroek Airfield. Both Zaventem Airport and Melsbroek Air Base, the military airfield, share the same runways.

=== Development since the 1960s ===
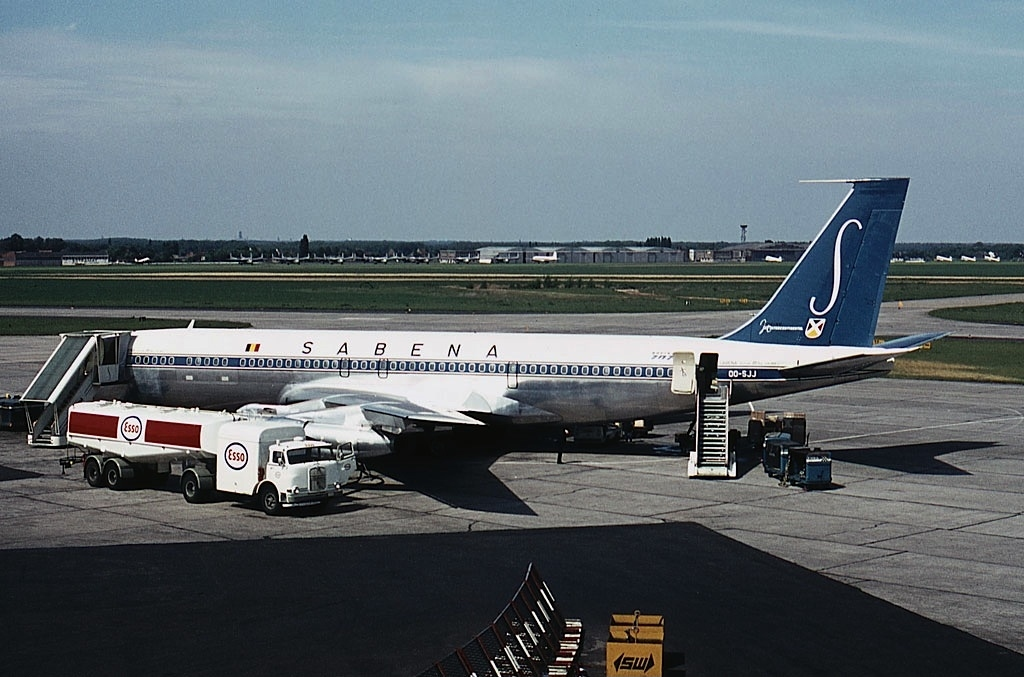
Sabena Boeing 707-300 at Brussels Airport in 1966

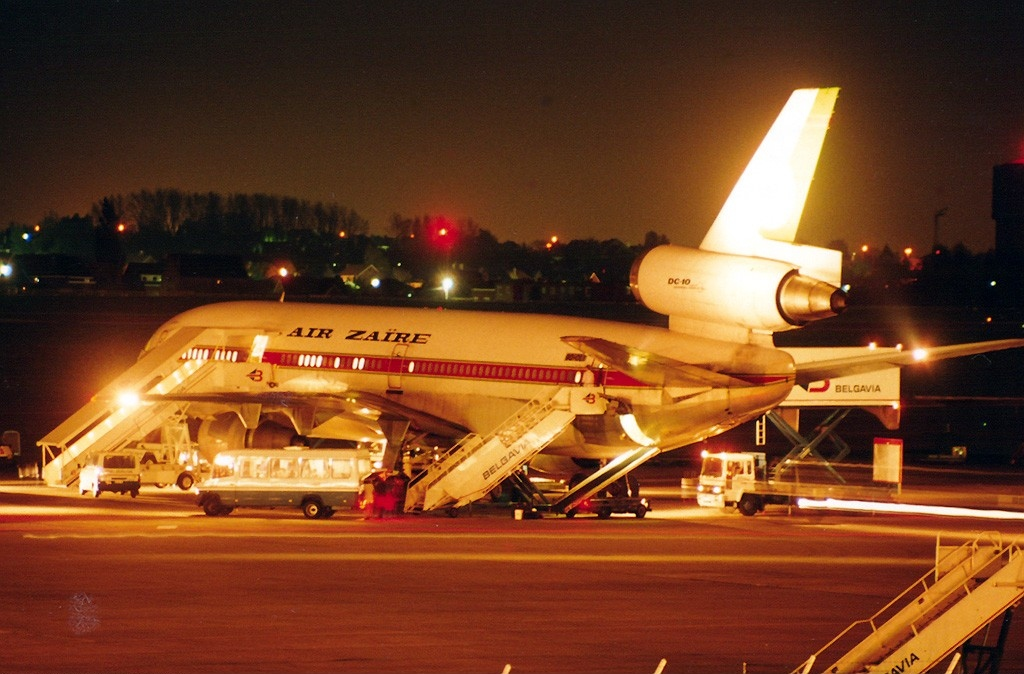
Air Zaïre McDonnell Douglas DC-10 at Brussels Airport in 1990

During the boom of commercial aviation in the 1960s and 1970s, several hangars were constructed. A new cargo terminal was constructed in 1976. In 1994, a brand new terminal was constructed adjacent to the old 1958 building. Two old piers were torn down and replaced by modern ones. In 2002, amidst the turmoil surrounding the demise of the national airline Sabena, a new pier was opened.

In 2005, the airport was awarded Best Airport in Europe by Airports Council International / International Air Transport Association (ACI/IATA), based on a survey of over 100,000 passengers worldwide. Brussels Airport continued to appear in top airports lists as of 2012. A direct train link with Leuven and Liège was opened on 12 December 2005.

In 2007, the airport served 17.8 million passengers, an increase of 7% over 2006. The cargo volume in the same year amounted to 780,000 tonnes, an increase of 8.9% over 2006. In 2008, the airport served 18.5 million passengers, which was an increase of 3.7% over the previous year.

Sabena's demise meant a sharp fall in passenger traffic, a blow from which the airport only slowly recovered. The airport's future is threatened by disagreement between the governments of Flanders and the Brussels Capital Region concerning night-time air traffic routes.

In March 2009, the old mechanical Flight information display systems were replaced by electronic ones. In September 2009, CEO Wilfried Van Assche resigned. One of the (unofficial) reasons was the delay in the construction of the low-cost terminal and the possible lawsuit by 52 airlines active at Brussels Airport, on the grounds of tax discrimination. It was Van Assche who started expanding the Long-Haul network (Jet Airways, Hainan Airlines, Etihad Airways and US Airways) at Brussels Airport. In February 2010 Arnaud Feist was appointed CEO. The Chairman of the Board is Marc Descheemaecker.

On 18 February 2013, in the 2013 Belgium diamond heist, eight men armed with automatic weapons and dressed in police uniforms seized 120 small parcels containing an estimated US$50 million worth of diamonds from a Helvetic Airways Fokker 100 passenger plane loaded with passengers preparing for departure to Zürich. The men drove two vehicles through a hole they had cut in the airport perimeter fence to Flight LX789, which had just been loaded with diamonds from a Brink's armored van from Antwerp. They carried out the operation within five minutes with no injuries and without firing a shot.

=== 2016 Brussels bombings ===
On 22 March 2016, two explosions took place in Brussels Airport at 07:58 local time. One occurred near the American Airlines and Brussels Airlines check-in desks and the other next to a Starbucks coffee shop. A third bomb was found in the airport and detonated in a controlled explosion. The airport was closed after the attacks until 3 April, when it reopened with temporary facilities at less than 20% of its previous passenger capacity. Flights bound to Brussels Airport were either cancelled or diverted to nearby airports such as Brussels South Charleroi Airport, Ostend–Bruges International Airport, and Schiphol. At 09:11 CET, an explosion took place at Maelbeek/Maalbeek metro station. ISIL claimed responsibility for the attacks as an act of revenge against Belgium for participation in the ongoing Military intervention against ISIL.

== Facilities ==
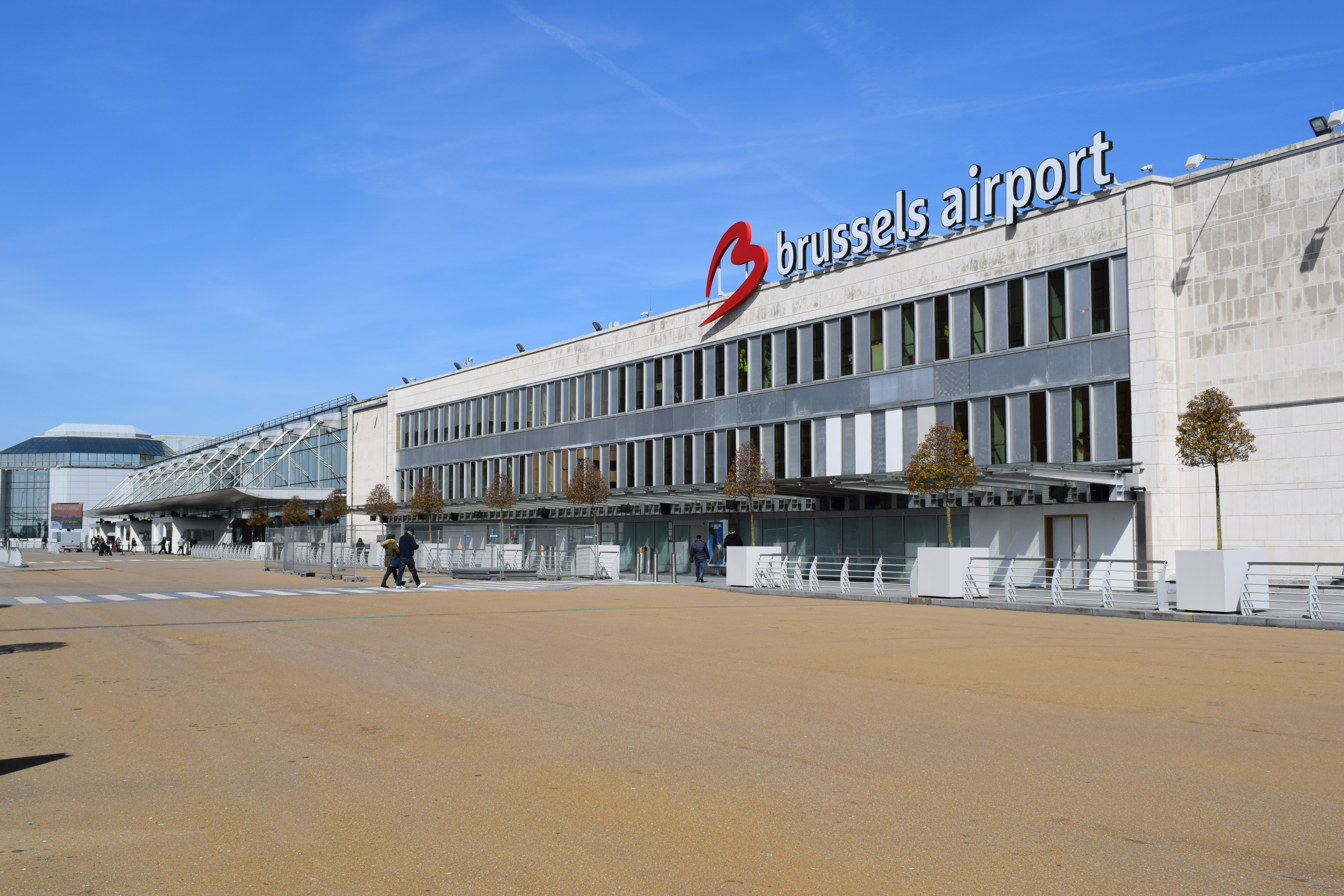
Terminal exterior

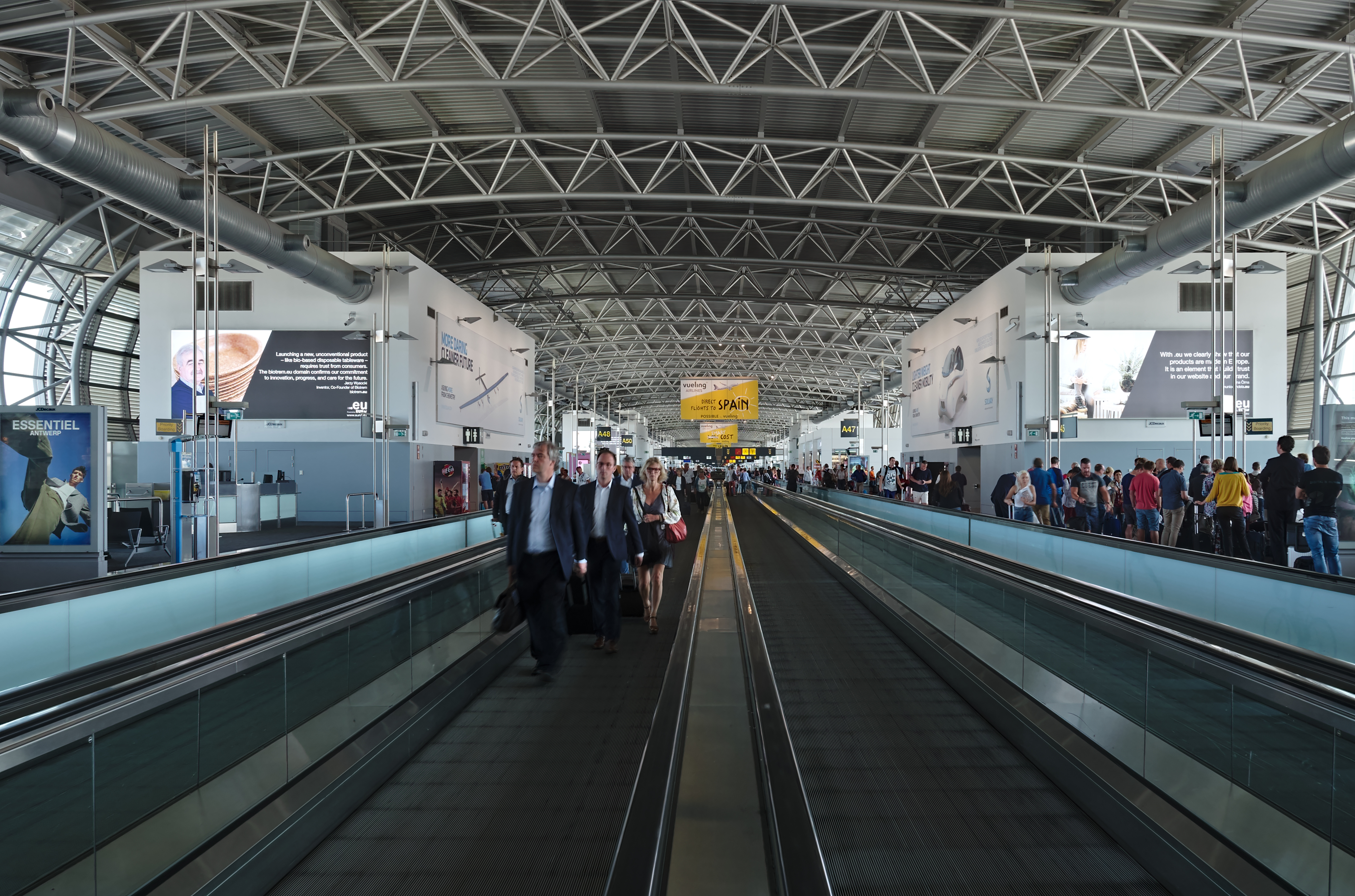
Departures area at Pier A

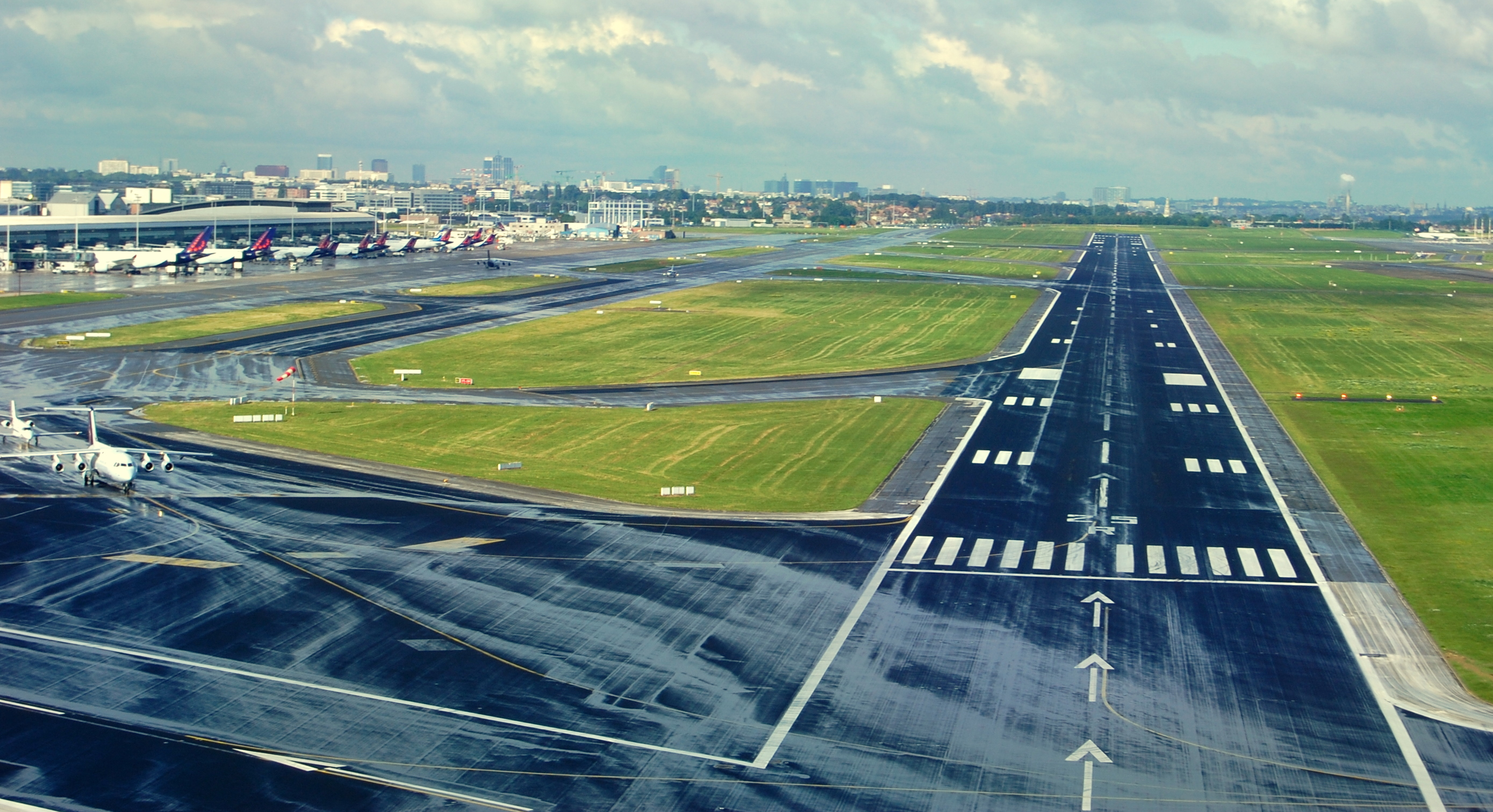
Runway and apron

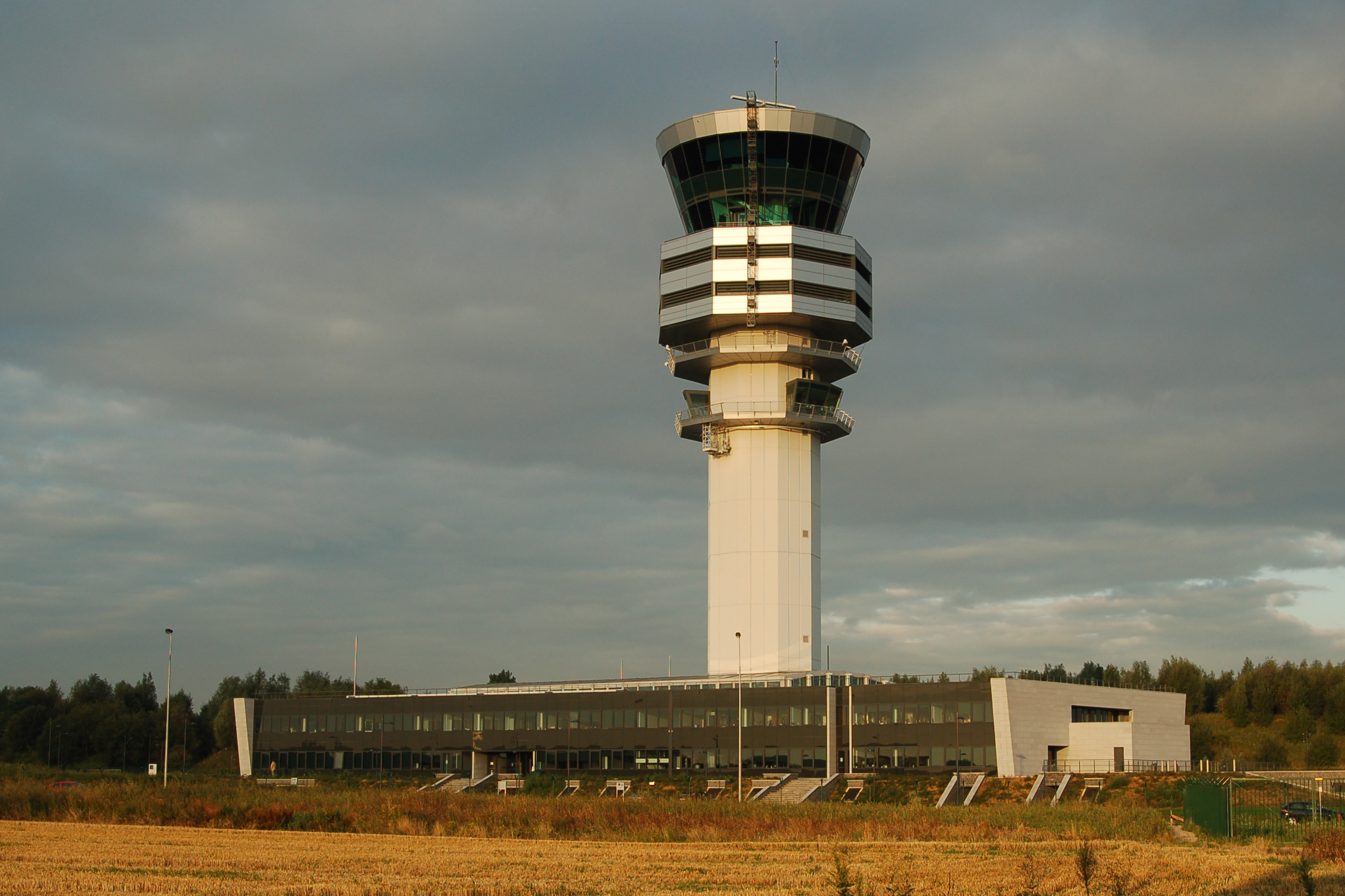
Control tower

Brussels Airport uses a one terminal concept, meaning that all the facilities are located under a single roof. The terminal building consists of several levels. The railway station is located on −1, buses and taxis arrive at 0, arrivals are located on level 2 and departures on level 3. Levels 2 and 3 are connected to the airport's two piers (A and B).

=== Pier A ===
The newest pier in Brussels airport was pier A, opened on 15 May 2002. This pier was destined to support flights from and to the Schengen countries (A-gates). However, since 15 October 2008 all Brussels Airlines flights to African destinations are also handled at this pier. Therefore, border control was installed towards the end of the pier in order to create a new pier. As a result, gates A61-72 were renamed T61-72. Later, Brussels Airlines' daily flight to New York was also moved here from pier B.

Until 26 March 2015, Pier A was connected to the main building via a 400-metre-long (1,300 ft) tunnel under the apron. Each pier used to have its own security zone, so transfer between the piers involved a security check, which for practical purposes made it in essence two terminals. This tunnel was replaced by the "Connector", a new building that links both piers above ground and allows passengers to walk straight from the check-in desk to their gate in pier A or B, without changing floors. In the opposite direction, the building provides arriving passengers with a smooth and convenient passage to the baggage reclaim hall and the exit. Furthermore, border control has been relocated behind the 25-lane screening platform (Europe's largest) inside the Connector which means that changing planes no longer requires a security check.

=== Pier B ===
Pier B is the oldest pier still in use at Brussels Airport and is only used for flights outside the Schengen Area. Pier B is connected immediately to the main departure hall and consists of two decks. The upper deck (level 3) is at the same level as the departure halls and is used for the departing passengers, whereas the lower deck (level 2) is used for arriving passengers and connects immediately to border control and the baggage claim area.

=== Planned ===
==== Pier A West ====
Pier A West is a planned expansion of Pier A, and is meant to relieve Pier B by also handling flights from non-Schengen countries. Pier A West was due to open in 2016, but because of the slow passenger growth, Brussels Airport announced in July 2013 that the works would be delayed. However, in November 2015, Brussels Airport announced a major 550 million euro investment and pointed out that within this investment the extension of the pier is included.

==== Low-cost pier ====
Just as is the case for Pier A West, the construction of a new low-cost pier is currently on hold. It will be built roughly where the old south pier used to be. At present, several low-cost airlines including Ryanair and Wizz Air fly to Brussels-South Charleroi Airport, 40 km (25 mi) away from Brussels. In autumn 2013, low-cost carrier Pegasus Airlines announced it would end its flights between Brussels Airport and Turkey. The service between Brussels and Istanbul–Sabiha Gökçen would relocate to Brussels-South Charleroi Airport. However, Turkish Airlines announced on 26 November 2013 it would offer one daily flight on the same route, starting one month after Pegasus terminated its operations at the airport. One day later, Ryanair announced the opening of a second Belgian base at Brussels Airport, giving a boost to low-cost traffic at Brussels Airport. Ryanair announced on 27 November 10 new routes from Brussels Airport, although Brussels-South Charleroi Airport will remain the low-cost carrier's primary Belgian base.

=== Services ===
Drinking water fountains are found all over the airport. After security check-in, water bottles are available for a small fee.

Shops, bars and restaurants are scattered throughout the building. A few facilities are located in the departure area. These are mostly convenience stores and small shops such as the airport shop, a pharmacy, Relay stores and a coffee shop. But most of the facilities can only be accessed after Security control –and are tax free. Several brands and chains have a branch in both piers, however several only operate in pier A. The airport also features places of worship (for Catholics, Jews, Muslims, Orthodox Christians and Protestants), as well as a place for meditation for humanists. The airport provides meeting facilities and can host congresses up to 600 participants, either in the Regus Skyport Meeting Center or in the Sheraton Brussels Airport Hotel. The latter is the only hotel located on the airport grounds, opposite the terminal. Shuttle services are provided to 14 nearby hotels.

All passengers now have unlimited free Wi-Fi access.

=== Other facilities ===
Several airlines have or had its head offices at the grounds of Brussels Airport. Brussels Airlines has its corporate head office in the b.house, Airport Building 26, located in Diegem, Machelen. European Air Transport had its head office in Building 4–5, in Zaventem. Before Sabena went out of business, its head office was in the Sabena House on the grounds of Brussels Airport. When it existed, Virgin Express had its head office in Building 116 in Zaventem. SN Brussels, which formed in 2002, had its head office in Airport Building 117 in Zaventem when it existed. Prior to its disestablishment, Sobelair had its head office in Building 45 in Zaventem. CityBird was based in building 117D. The cargo airline Cargo B Airlines had its head office in the Brucarco Building 706 in Zaventem.

== Airlines and destinations ==
=== Passenger ===
The following airlines operate regular scheduled and charter flights to and from Brussels:

Airlines	Destinations
Aegean Airlines	Athens, Larnaca, Thessaloniki
Aer Lingus	Dublin
Air Algérie	Algiers; Seasonal: Oran
Air Arabia	Casablanca, Fès, Nador, Oujda, Rabat, Tangier
Air Cairo	Cairo, Luxor (both begin 18 December 2026)
Air Canada	Montréal–Trudeau; Seasonal: Toronto–Pearson
Air China	Beijing–Capital, Chengdu–Tianfu
Air Congo	Kinshasa–N'djili
Air Europa	Madrid
Air Montenegro	Podgorica (begins 30 November 2026)
Air Serbia	Belgrade
Air Transat	Seasonal: Montréal–Trudeau
airBaltic	Riga, Tallinn
AJet	Istanbul–Sabiha Gökçen; Seasonal: Ankara
All Nippon Airways	Tokyo–Narita
Amelia International	Brive
Austrian Airlines	Vienna; Seasonal: Innsbruck
Azerbaijan Airlines	Baku (begins 8 May 2027)
British Airways	London–Heathrow
Brussels Airlines	Abidjan, Accra, Alicante, Athens, Banjul, Barcelona, Berlin, Bilbao, Bologna, Budapest, Bujumbura, Cairo (begins 29 march 2027), Catania, Conakry, Copenhagen, Cotonou, Dakar–Diass, Douala, Edinburgh, Entebbe, Faro, Florence, Frankfurt, Freetown, Fuerteventura, Funchal, Geneva, Gothenburg, Gran Canaria, Hamburg, Hurghada, Kigali, Kilimanjaro, Kinshasa–N'djili, Kraków, Lanzarote, Lisbon, Ljubljana, Lomé, London–Heathrow, Lyon, Madrid, Málaga, Manchester, Marseille, Milan–Linate, Milan–Malpensa, Monrovia–Roberts, Munich, Nairobi–Jomo Kenyatta, New York–JFK, Nice, Oslo, Ouagadougou, Paris–Charles de Gaulle, Porto, Prague, Rome–Fiumicino, Stockholm–Arlanda, Tel Aviv, Toulouse, Valencia, Venice, Vienna, Vilnius, Warsaw–Chopin, Yaoundé, Yerevan, Zürich; Seasonal: Antalya, Bordeaux, Brindisi, Chania, Corfu, Djerba, Dubrovnik, Evenes, Heraklion, Ibiza, Kittilä (begins 10 december 2026), Kemi-Tornio (begins 25 december 2026), Kos, Marrakesh, Monastir, Mytilene, Nador, Naples, Olbia, Oujda, Palma de Mallorca, Rabat, Rhodes, Samos, Sharm El Sheikh, Split, Tangier, Washington–Dulles, Zadar, Zakynthos
Bulgaria Air	Sofia
Cathay Pacific	Hong Kong
Chalair Aviation	Seasonal: Brive
Corendon Airlines	Seasonal: Antalya, Bodrum, Burgas, Dalaman, Heraklion, Izmir, Kos, Palma de Mallorca, Rhodes, Tenerife–South
Croatia Airlines	Zagreb
Cyprus Airways	Larnaca
Dan Air	Bacău
Delta Air Lines	Atlanta
easyJet	Bordeaux, Geneva, Milan–Linate, Nantes, Nice, Rome–Fiumicino
Egyptair	Cairo
Emirates	Dubai–International
Ethiopian Airlines	Addis Ababa
Etihad Airways	Abu Dhabi
Finnair	Helsinki; Seasonal: Rovaniemi
Flynas	Jeddah, Medina
FlyOne	Bucharest–Otopeni, Chișinău, Yerevan
Freebird	Antalya
Hainan Airlines	Beijing–Capital, Chongqing, Shanghai–Pudong, Shenzhen
HiSky	Bucharest–Otopeni
Iberia	Madrid
Icelandair	Reykjavík–Keflavík
ITA Airways	Milan–Linate, Rome–Fiumicino
Juneyao Air	Shanghai–Pudong
KLM	Amsterdam
KM Malta Airlines	Malta
LATAM Brasil	São Paulo–Guarulhos
LOT Polish Airlines	Gdańsk, Warsaw–Chopin
Lufthansa	Frankfurt, Munich
Middle East Airlines	Beirut
Norwegian Air Shuttle	Seasonal: Oslo, Tromsø
Nouvelair	Seasonal: Djerba, Monastir, Tunis
Qatar Airways	Doha
Royal Air Maroc	Casablanca, Marrakesh, Rabat, Tangier, Tétouan; Seasonal: Al Hoceima, Oujda
Royal Jordanian	Amman–Queen Alia
RwandAir	Kigali
Ryanair	Barcelona, Dublin, Madrid, Málaga, Marrakesh, Porto, Rome–Fiumicino, Valencia; Seasonal: Girona, Palma de Mallorca, Pisa
Scandinavian Airlines	Copenhagen, Oslo, Stockholm–Arlanda
Singapore Airlines	Singapore
Sky Express	Athens; Seasonal: Heraklion
Smartwings	Prague
SunExpress	Eskişehir; Seasonal: Adana/Mersin, Ankara, Antalya, Izmir, Kayseri
Swiss International Air Lines	Geneva, Zürich
TAP Air Portugal	Lisbon
TAROM	Bucharest–Otopeni
Thai Airways International	Bangkok–Suvarnabhumi
Transavia	Alicante, Bari, Bordeaux, Faro, Gran Canaria (begins 28 october 2026), Marrakesh Porto (begins 14 December 2026); Seasonal: Heraklion (resumes 30 March 2027), Ibiza, Málaga, Ponta Delgada (begins 30 March 2027), Reykjavík–Keflavík (begins 30 october 2026), Seville, Tenerife–South, Thessaloniki (resumes 28 June 2027)
TUI fly Belgium	Agadir, Algiers, Al Hoceima, Alicante, Antalya, Béjaïa, Billund (begins 27 March 2027), Boa Vista, Casablanca, Constantine, Dakar–Diass, Djerba, Enfidha, Eskişehir, Fès, Fuerteventura, Funchal, Gran Canaria, Hurghada, Lanzarote, Málaga, Marrakesh, Marsa Alam, Oran, Oujda, Paris–Charles de Gaulle, Rabat, Sal, Sharm El Sheikh, Tenerife–South, Tlemcen; Seasonal: Almería, Banjul, Bodrum, Brindisi, Burgas, Catania, Chania, Corfu, Dalaman, Dubrovnik, Faro, Girona, Heraklion, Innsbruck, Ibiza, Izmir, Jerez de la Frontera, Kayseri, Kittilä, Kos, Lamezia Terme, Larnaca, Ljubljana (begins 28 March 2027), Luxor, Menorca, Murcia, Mykonos, Mytilene, Nador, Naples, Palermo, Palma de Mallorca, Paphos, Patras, Ponta Delgada, Pristina, Reus, Rhodes, Sälen-Trysil, Samos, Santorini, Tangier, Tétouan, Thessaloniki, Tirana, Tivat, Varna, Zakynthos
Tunisair	Tunis
Turkish Airlines	Istanbul
United Airlines	Chicago–O'Hare, Newark, Washington–Dulles
Volotea	Asturias
Vueling	Alicante, Barcelona, Bilbao, Florence, Málaga, Valencia; Seasonal: Palma de Mallorca
Widerøe	Bergen

=== Cargo ===
Airlines	Destinations
Air Belgium	Aşgabat
Emirates SkyCargo	London–Stansted
Ethiopian Cargo	Addis Ababa, Johannesburg–O.R. Tambo, Miami, Seoul–Incheon
LATAM Cargo Chile	Campinas, Frankfurt, Santiago de Chile
Qatar Airways Cargo	Accra, Chicago–O'Hare, Doha, Los Angeles
Royal Air Maroc Cargo	Casablanca
Singapore Airlines Cargo	Amsterdam, Berlin, Frankfurt, Mumbai, Munich, Sharjah, Singapore
Suparna Airlines Cargo	Moscow–Domodedovo, Zhengzhou
Turkish Cargo	Istanbul
Virgin Atlantic	Seasonal: London–Heathrow

== Statistics ==
=== Traffic ===
Traffic by calendar year
Year	Passenger volume	Change over previous year	Aircraft operations	Change over previous year	Cargo (tonnes)	Change over previous year
2025	24,383,115	▲+3.3%	204,147	▲+2.8%	795,271	▲+8.5%
2024	23,610,856	▲6.4%	198,617	▲3.0%	732,797	▲5.0%
2023	22,200,755	▲16.9%	192,257	▲7.4%	585,203	▼5.8%
2022	18,930,698	▲102.31%	178,930	▲50.7%	621,482	▼7.0%
2021	9,357,221	▲38.76%	118,733	▲23.92%	668,110	▲30.59%
2020	6,743,395	▼74.42%	95,813	▼59.13%	511,613	▲2.18%
2019	26,360,003	▲2.70%	234,460	▼0.40%	500,702	▼7.9%
2018	25,675,939	▲3.60%	235,459	▼1.00%	543,493	▲1.5%
2017	24,783,911	▲13.60%	237,888	▲6.30%	535,634	▲8.30%
2016	21,818,418	▼7.00%	223,688	▼6.50%	494,637	▲1.10%
2015	23,460,018	▲6.96%	239,349	▲3.38%	489,303	▲7.79%
2014	21,933,190	▲14.60%	231,528	▲6.90%	453,954	▲5.60%
2013	19,133,222	▲0.90%	216,678	▼3.00%	429,938	▼6.40%
2012	18,971,332	▲1.00%	223,431	▼4.40%	459,265	▼3.30%
2011	18,786,034	▲9.30%	233,758	▲3.60%	475,124	▼0.20%
2010	17,180,606	▲1.10%	225,682	▼2.60%	476,135	▲6.00%
2009	16,999,154	▼8.20%	231,668	▼10.50%	449,132	▼32.1%
2008	18,515,730	▲3.40%	258,795	▼2.10%	661,143	▼15.60%
2007	17,900,000	▲7.10%	264,366	▲3.80%	783,727	▲8.90%
2006	16,707,892	▲3.30%	254,772	▲0.60%	719,561	▲2.40%
2005	16,179,733	▲3.50%	253,255	▼0.30%	702,819	▲5.80%
2004	15,632,773	▲2.90%	254,070	▲0.70%	664,375	▲9.40%
2003	15,194,097	▲5.40%	252,249	▼1.80%	607,136	▲13.1%
2002	14,410,555	▼26.8%	256,889	▼15.9%	536,826	▼8.00%
2001	19,684,867	▼9.00%	305,532	▼6.30%	583,729	▼15.1%
2000	21,637,003	▲7.90%	352,972	▲4.20%	687,385	▲1.90%
1999	20,048,532	▲15.7%	312,892	▲4.30%	674,837	–
1998	18,400,000	▲15.7%	300,000	▲8.30%		
1997	15,900,000	▲18.7%	277,000	▲4.90%		
1996	13,400,000	▲7.20%	264,000	–		
1995	12,500,000	▲11.6%				
1994	11,200,000	–				
1993	10,000,000+	–				
1950	240,000+	–				

- The relapse in 2001 and 2002 is due to the combined effects of the September 11 attacks and the collapse of then home carrier Sabena in the final quarter of 2001.
- The cargo relapse in 2008 and 2009 is due to the combined effects of the 2008 financial crisis, also affecting passenger volumes in 2009, and the relocation of DHL Aviation to Leipzig/Halle Airport. DHL departed after the Belgian government decided they could not operate more cargo flights at night because of noise for the people living in the surrounding area.
- The 2016 decrease in passenger numbers and aircraft movements results from the 2016 Brussels bombings which caused the airport to close for 11 days before reopening with severely reduced capacity.

=== Routes ===
Busiest European routes from Brussels Airport
Rank	Destination	Airport(s)	Passengers 2024
1	Madrid	MAD	1,014,027
2	Barcelona	BCN	883,847
3	Rome	FCO	633,983
4	Malaga	AGP	620,931
5	London	LHR	571,288
6	Alicante	ALC	538,283
7	Geneva	GVA	526,592
8	Vienna	VIE	518,716
9	Lisbon	LIS	516,642
10	Frankfurt	FRA	514,276

Busiest Intercontinental routes from Brussels Airport
Rank	Destination	Airport(s)	Passengers 2024
1	Dubai	DXB	384,322
2	Newark	EWR	266,999
3	New York City	JFK	265,503
4	Washington, D.C.	IAD	263,836
5	Doha	DOH	259,003
6	Montréal	YUL	236,468
7	Tangier	TNG	234,834
8	Casablanca	CMN	220,908
9	Chicago	ORD	202,871
10	Abu Dhabi	AUH	198,327

== Ground transportation ==
=== Road ===
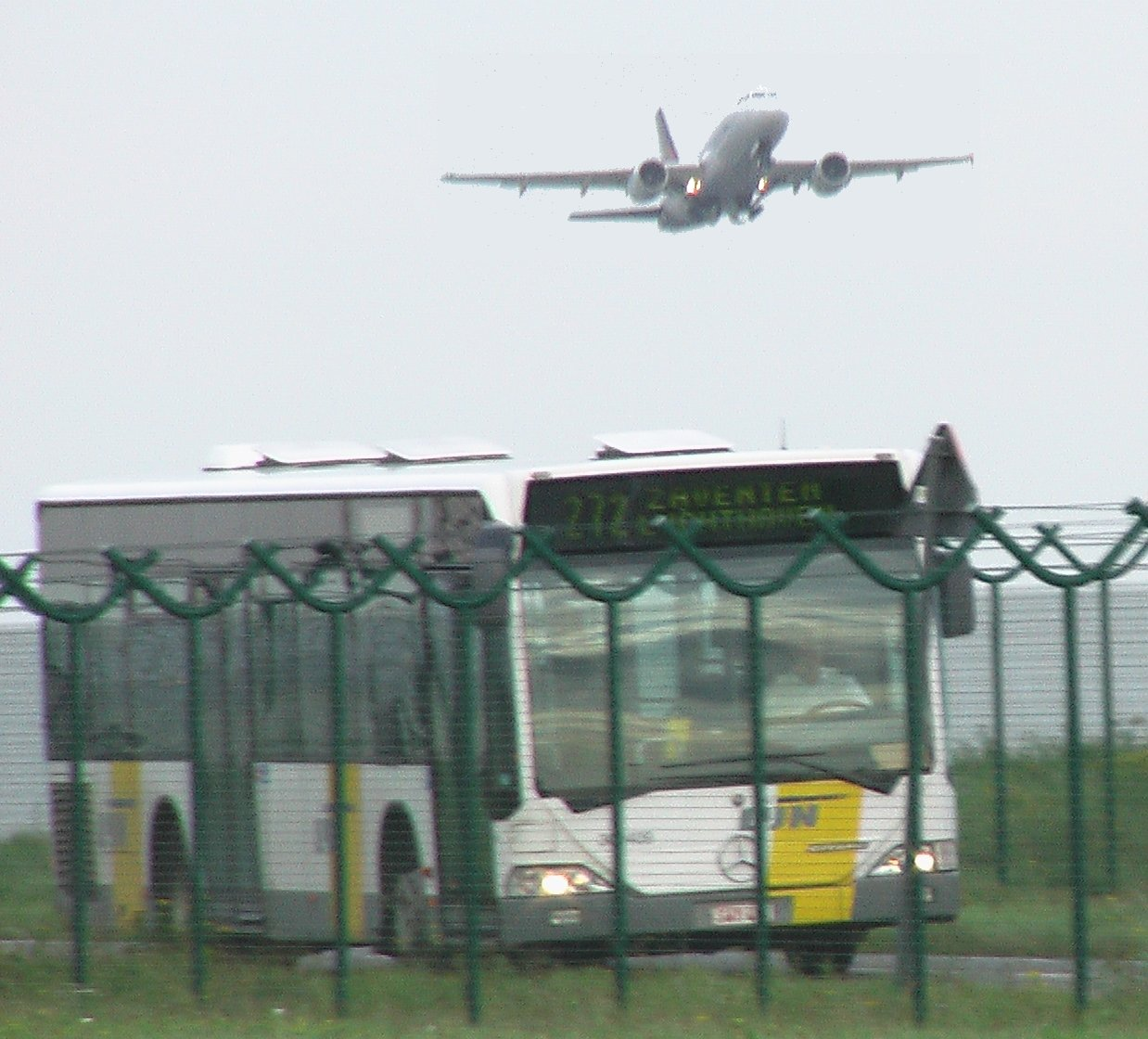
Brussels Airport bus service

Brussels Airport can be reached by car via the A201, which is directly connected to the Brussels Ring (R0) orbital motorway. From there, the main motorways of Belgium can directly be accessed. Private partners provide three car parks at the airport, offering in total 10,600 parking spaces. Shell operates a self-service filling station near the exit of the airport complex.

For bus transportation, De Lijn provides services to and from various cities in Flanders from platforms A and B (via Brucargo). The Brussels Intercommunal Transport Company (STIB/MIVB) provides transportation into Brussels city centre from Schuman railway station, Brussels-Luxembourg railway station, and Trône/Troon metro station via line 12 from platform C. Platform E is used by Hotel Shuttles, offering services to several hotels near the area.

Taxis are permanently available in front of the arrivals hall. Licensed taxis can be recognized by a blue and yellow emblem.

=== Ground Transportation at Brussels Airport ===
Brussels Airport is accessible by car via the A201, which connects directly to the Brussels Ring (R0) orbital motorway. From there, the main motorways of Belgium can be directly accessed. Private partners provide three car parks at the airport, offering a total of 10,600 parking spaces. Shell operates a self-service filling station near the exit of the airport complex.

Several car rental services are located in the airport, including Europcar, Hertz, Sixt, and Thrifty.

For bus transportation, De Lijn provides services to and from various cities in Flanders from platforms A and B (via Brucargo). The Brussels Intercommunal Transport Company (STIB/MIVB) provides transportation into Brussels city centre from Schuman railway station, Brussels-Luxembourg railway station, and Trône/Troon metro station via line 12 from platform C. Additionally, the Flibco shuttle network connects Brussels Airport to various destinations, including inter-airport transfers and routes to cities such as Lille, Antwerp, and Luxembourg. Platform E is used by Hotel Shuttles, offering services to several hotels near the area.

Taxis are permanently available in front of the arrivals hall. Licensed taxis can be recognized by a blue and yellow emblem.

=== Rail ===
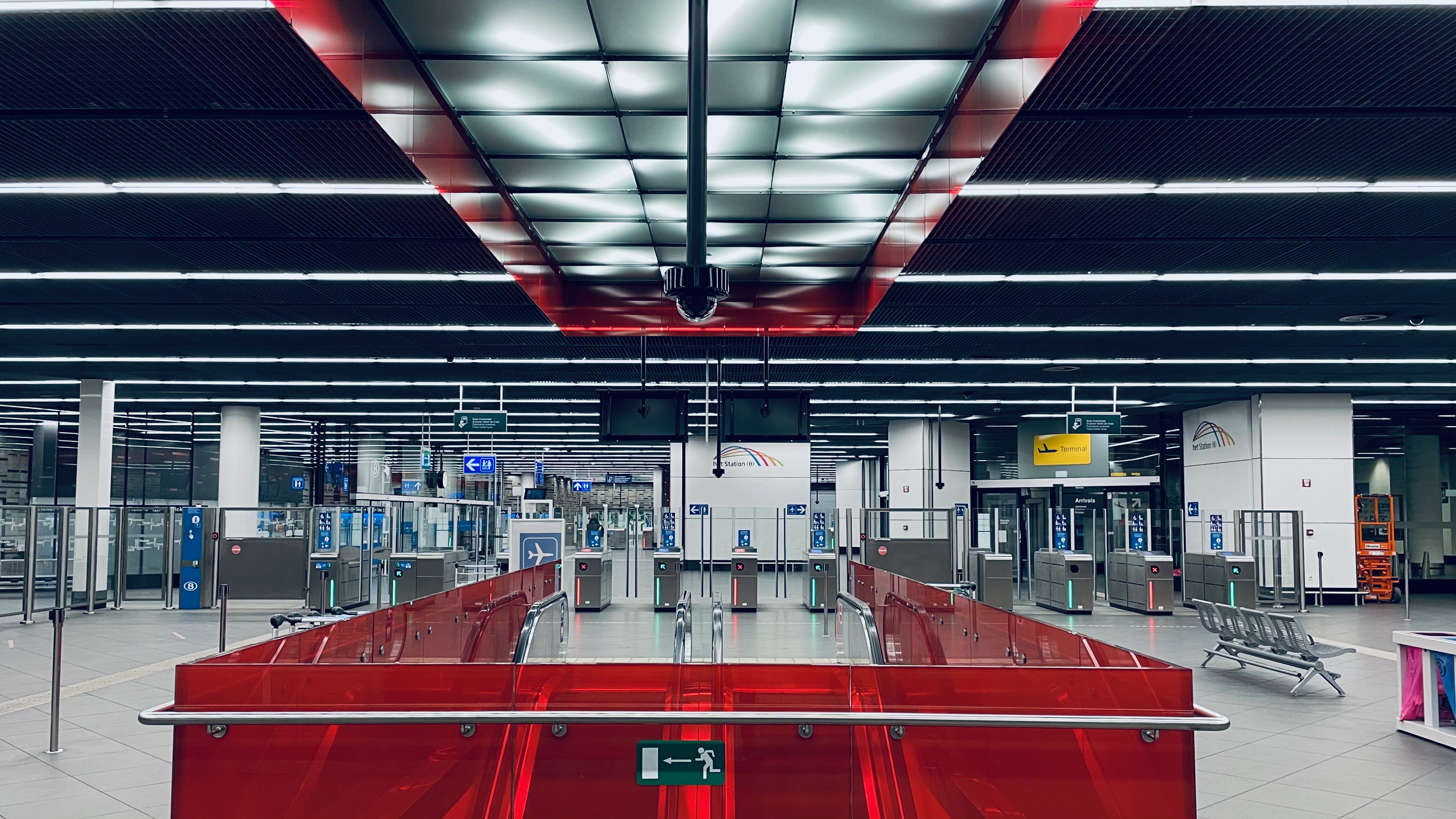
Brussels Airport-Zaventem railway station

Brussels Airport-Zaventem railway station is located under the airport building at level −1. The train station has direct services to Antwerp, Brussels, De Panne, Ghent, Hasselt, Landen, Leuven, Mechelen, Nivelles and Quévy. At least four trains per hour serve the most used link to Brussels-South railway station, where international connections are offered by Eurostar (to Amsterdam, Avignon, Cologne, Essen, Lille, London, Marseille, Paris and Valence), ICE (to Cologne and Frankfurt), and Eurocity (to Basel, Bern, Chur, Luxembourg and Zürich).

A direct train link with Leuven was opened on 12 December 2005. A direct link with Antwerp and Mechelen via the so-called Diabolo line was opened for public service on 10 June 2012. The Diabolo project is a public-private partnership. It has been decided that all rail passengers to and from Brussels Airport-Zaventem railway station pay a "Diabolo supplement" to finance the ongoing and planned work.

As of December 2014, a direct train link between Bruges and the airport will be offered, just as an Intercity service to Schiphol and Amsterdam.

Since the new Schuman-Josaphat tunnel has been finished, a new connection has been established to connect Brussels Airport directly to the stations of the European Quarter, being Brussels-Schuman and Brussels-Luxembourg. This brought the travel time between the airport and the European Quarter to 15 minutes. The National Railway Company of Belgium (NMBS/SNCB) announced the line to open as an hourly service. However, the line now sees a train every 30 minutes on weekdays.

=== Tram ===
In an attempt to alleviate the gridlock around Brussels, the Flemish regional transport company De Lijn started the Brabantnet project, which was then scheduled to be finished by 2020.

Three new light rail lines will be created, of which 2 will terminate at Brussels Airport:

- The Airport Tram, connecting Brussels Airport to Brussels-North railway station, but taking a different trajectory from the existing railway line;
- The Ring Tram, roughly following the northern side of the Brussels Ring and connecting several Brussels suburbs and Vilvoorde to the airport.

To speed up the process, testing started in August 2016 with a Ringtrambus, a bus rapid transit system developed by Belgian bus builder Van Hool, which requires less investment than a tram. The Ringtrambus started service on 28 July 2020, using fourteen 24-metre double-articulated buses. The initial half-hourly service is to be upgraded to quarter-hourly on 1 September 2020. Route 820 runs between Brussels Airport and the Brussels University Hospital in Jette, via Brucargo, the station and the centre of Vilvoorde, the Kassei neighbourhood, the employment area around the Medialaan, Strombeek and the Heysel/Heizel. This solution is presented as an in-between step until the tram line is finished.

The Airport Tram will be an extension of present Brussels tram lines 55 and 62, and will roughly follow the A201 motorway, but will need a large bridge to cross the Brussels Ring into the airport. The present tram tracks end at the Eurocontrol headquarters, but the extension will lead from the Bourget Roundabout along the A12 into the airport. The new line will be a so-called 'high frequency' line (comparable to Brussels tram lines 7 and 8) connecting the northern part of the city with the Business zone next to the airport and the airport itself. Construction work is ongoing and should be finished by 2031.

=== Bicycle ===
Brussels Airport has a special separated road that provides access to the airport for bikers and pedestrians. There is also a special place to park bikes. Since 2019, the airport has a direct connection from the bicycle freeway Brussels–Leuven ("Fietssnelweg F3"). In 2016, merely 1% of employees were commuting by bike. In an effort to further increase this number, bicycle leasing was introduced to employees, and in 2020 almost 10% of the Brussels Airport employees signed up for this.

== Accidents and incidents ==
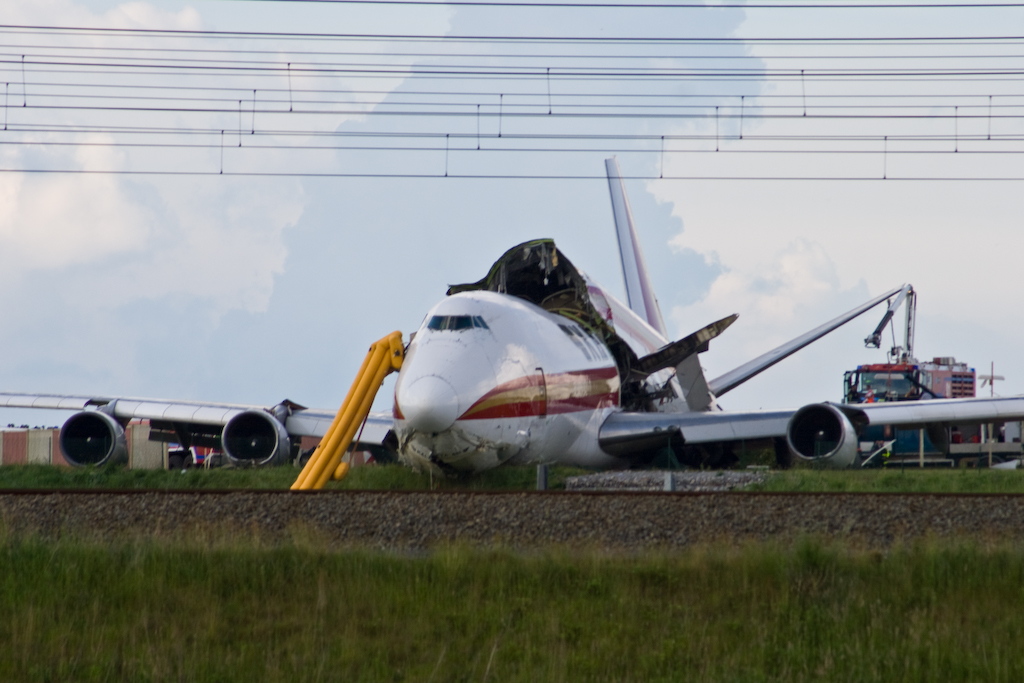
The Boeing 747 that overran the runway in 2008

- On 17 September 1946, a Sabena Douglas DC-3 went into a half roll and crashed into some hangars on takeoff because of loss of airspeed. One crewmember out of the seven occupants on board was killed.
- On 15 February 1961, Sabena Flight 548, a Boeing 707, crashed during approach on runway 20, killing all 72 people on board and one on the ground. This was the first fatal accident involving a Boeing 707, resulting in the death of the entire United States Figure Skating team on its way to the World Figure Skating Championships in Prague, Czechoslovakia, which the International Skating Union subsequently cancelled out of respect for the team.
- On 25 May 2008, Kalitta Air Flight 207, a Boeing 747-200F, overran the shorter runway 20, crashed into a field and split in three. Four of the five people on board received minor injuries.
- On 22 March 2016, during the 2016 Brussels bombings, the airport was targeted by bombs, claiming 32 lives, 16 at the airport and another 16 at a nearby metro station, plus over 300 injured.

== See also ==
- Brussels South Charleroi Airport
- Transport in Belgium
