= 15th Air Transport Wing =

- Dutch: 15 Wing Luchttransport; French: 15 Wing Transport Aérien
- 15 Wing Badge
- Active: 1948-present
- Country: Belgium
- Branch: Belgian Air Force
- Garrison/HQ: Steenokkerzeel

Commanders
- Current commander: Colonel Aviator Quentin Aelvoet

The 15th Air Transport Wing (Dutch: 15 Wing Luchttransport, French: 15 Wing Transport Aérien) is a wing in the Belgian Air Force of the Belgian Armed Forces. The 15th Wing's motto is TENACITY. A Sioux Indian chief completes the emblem.

The wing comprises two operational squadrons, the 21st Squadron and the 20th Squadron, and a Training & Conversion Unit. 21st Squadron is also known as the Liaison and Long-Haul Flight. 20th Squadron operates 7 Airbus A400M Atlas, which replaced the Lockheed C-130 Hercules military transport aircraft in 2021. It consists of about 72 crewmembers, making it one of the largest units in the Belgian Air Force.
