= SN Brussels Airlines =

Airline of Belgium (2002–2007)

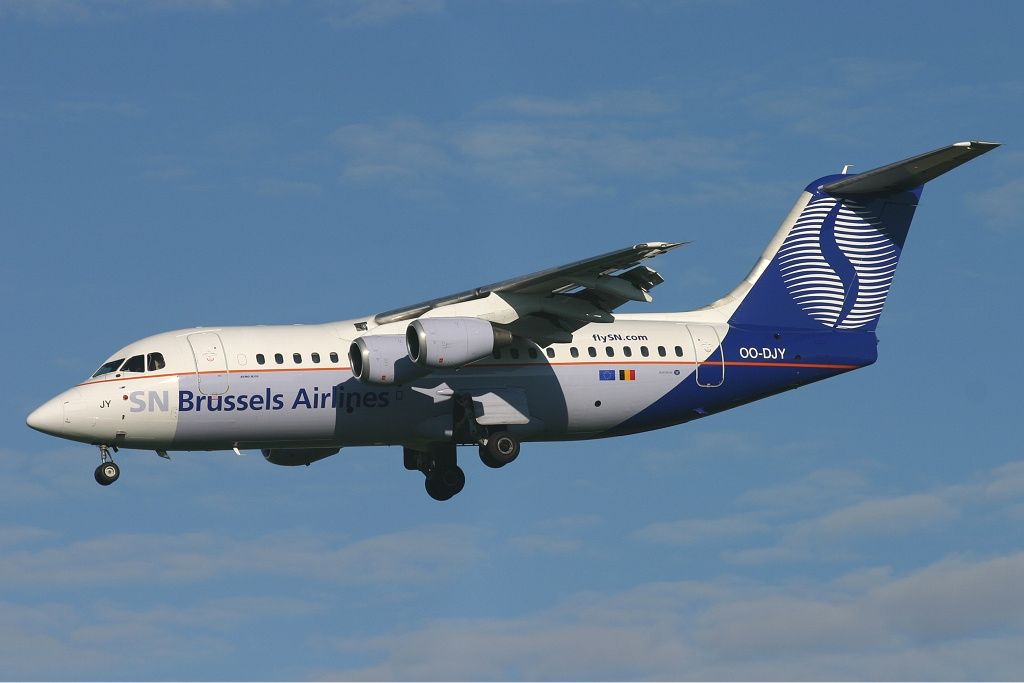
- Avro RJ85 in 2005
IATA	ICAO	Call sign
SN	SAB	BEE-LINE
- Commenced operations: 15 February 2002
- Ceased operations: 25 March 2007 (merged with Virgin Express to form Brussels Airlines)
- Hubs: Brussels Airport
- Frequent-flyer program: Privilege
- Subsidiaries: Sobelair (2002–2004)
- Parent company: SN Airholding
- Headquarters: Brussels Airport, Zaventem, Belgium

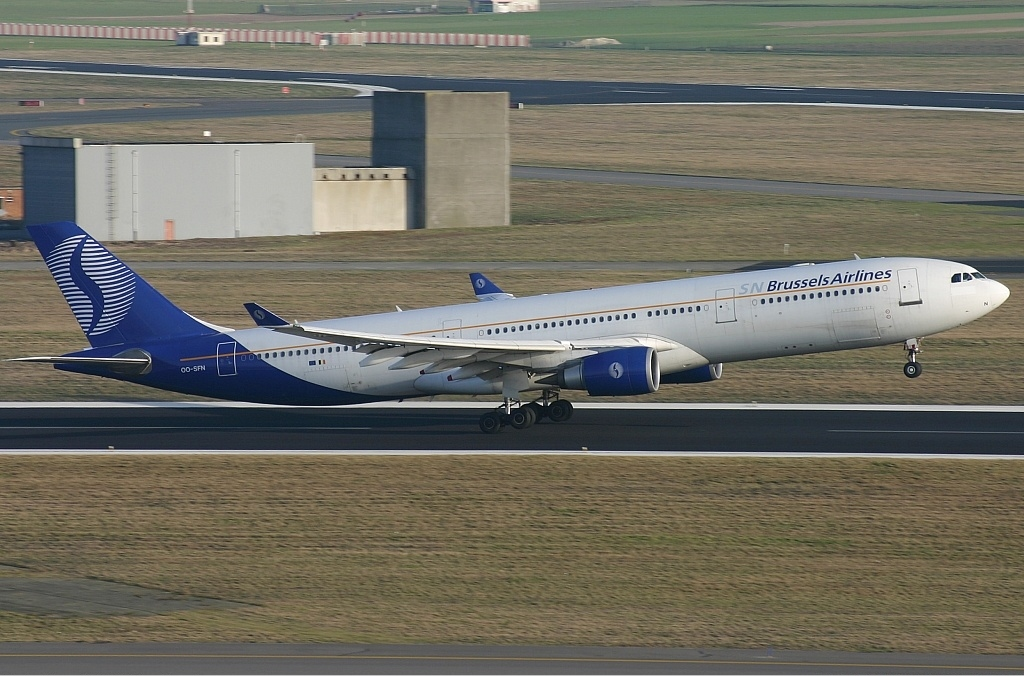
Airbus A330-300

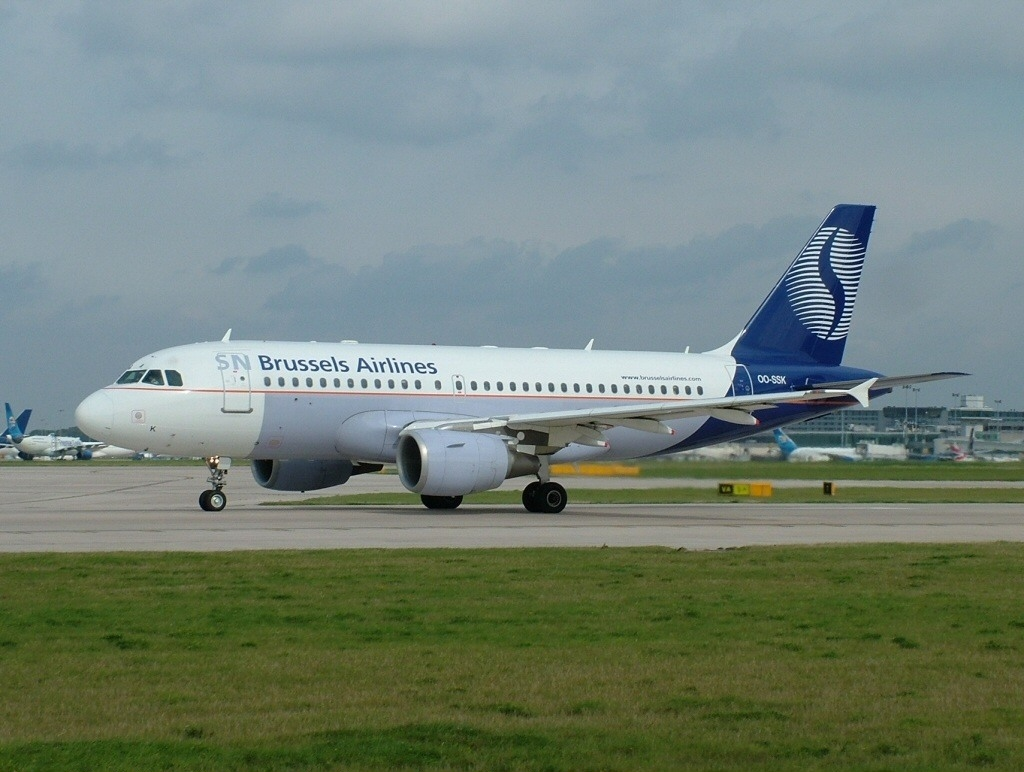
Airbus A319-100

SN Brussels Airlines (SNBA) was the flag carrier of Belgium, which mainly operated from Brussels Airport. SNBA was the trading name of the Belgian airline Delta Air Transport. SNBA was a full-service airline, connecting Brussels with the rest of Europe. It also flew to Africa, continuing Sabena's extensive network there. The airline merged with Virgin Express into Brussels Airlines which started operations on 25 March 2007. The airline had its head office at Brussels Airport.

== History ==
The airline was founded in 2002, when a group of Belgian investors (companies, financial institutions and regional investment companies, as well as the Brussels and Walloon governments) set up SN Airholding, headed by Étienne Davignon. After the 2001 collapse of Sabena, Belgium's then flag carrier airline, Belgium was left without a national airline for a few months. In February 2002, SN Airholding took over the Belgian airline DAT, a subsidiary of Sabena, and changed its trading name to SN Brussels Airlines. In 2002, a strategic reorganization started, led by the former CEO Peter Davies. On 12 April 2005 SN Brussels took holding control of Virgin Express and on 31 March 2006 they announced their merger. On 7 November 2006 they announced at a press conference held at Brussels Airport that the new airline would be called Brussels Airlines.

== Fleet ==
Before merging, SN Brussels Airlines operated the following aircraft:

SN Brussels Airlines fleet
Aircraft	Total	Passengers	Notes
Airbus A319-100	3	132	
Airbus A330-300	3	264	
Avro RJ85	14	82	
Avro RJ100	12	97	
BAe 146–200	6	84	

== Codeshare agreements ==
SN Brussels Airlines had codeshare agreements with the following airlines:

- American Airlines
- Etihad Airways
- Hainan Airlines
- Jet Airways
- Malmö Aviation

== Livery ==
The airline had various color schemes before finally settling on a uniform scheme for the fleet. The upper fuselage is white, while the belly and engines were painted lilac. An orange cheat line runs between the white and lilac parts of the fuselage. The tail shows the old Sabena "S". The website address is near the end of the fuselage. There are differences in livery between the Avro planes and the Airbus planes: most notably, the company name is written on the white part of the fuselage for the Airbus planes, but on the lilac part on the Avro.

Both this livery and the Virgin Express livery were replaced with the Brussels Airlines livery.
