= Ferdinand van Boisschot =

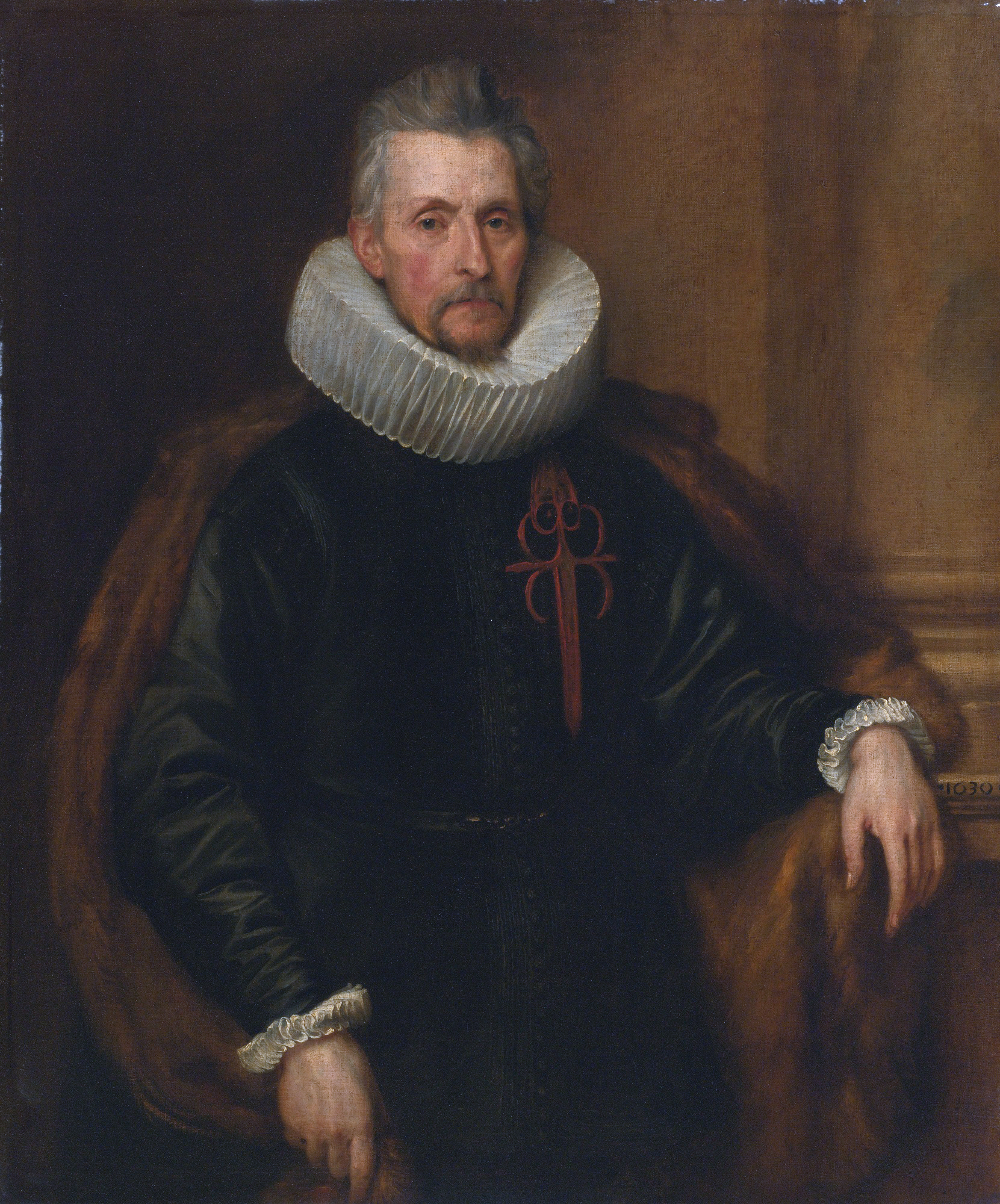
- Portrait of Boisschot, attributed to Van Dyck, 1630

Chancellor of Brabant
- In office 25 July 1625 – 24 November 1649
- Monarch: Philip IV of Spain
- Preceded by: Petrus Peckius Jr.
- Succeeded by: Frans I van Kinschot

Personal details
- Born: 26 June 1570 Brussels
- Died: 24 November 1649 (aged 79) Brussels
- Resting place: Church of Our Blessed Lady of the Sablon
- Spouse: Anna Maria de Camudio (m. 1607)
- Education: University of Cologne; University of Leuven
- Awards: Order of Santiago

Ferdinand van Boisschot or de Boisschot (1570–1649), Baron of Zaventem, was a jurist and diplomat from the Low Countries who became chancellor of the Duchy of Brabant.

== Early life ==
Boisschot was born in Brussels on 26 June 1570 as the son of Jan Baptist van Boisschot and Catharina van den Troncke. His father was a member of the Council of Brabant and was killed in the early stages of the Dutch Revolt during disturbances in Brussels in 1577/78. His family took refuge in Cologne, where Ferdinand commenced his studies. He studied law at the University of Cologne and at the University of Leuven and obtained the degree of doctor at law. He then became a member of the magistrature.

== Career ==
In 1592, Boisschot was appointed auditor general of the Army of Flanders, a post he held until 1611. From the beginning of 1611 until the end of 1615, he was the diplomatic representative in London of the Sovereign Archdukes Albert and Isabella. In 1615, Philip III of Spain made him a knight in the order of Santiago. He spent a further four years as resident ambassador of the Archdukes in Paris, and was appointed to the Privy Council and the Council of State in Brussels.

In 1621, Boisschot was raised to the peerage, being awarded the lordship of Zaventem, and he went on to acquire Fontaine Castle and Groot-Bijgaarden Castle, and the lordships of Nossegem, Sterrebeek and Sint-Stevens-Woluwe. In 1644, he became count of Erps. He was appointed Chancellor of Brabant, the highest civilian function in the duchy of Brabant, in October 1625, succeeding Petrus Peckius the Younger.

== Personal life ==
Boisschot married Anna Maria de Camudio in 1607. His wife was a member of a prominent Basque family, who had come to Brussels as a lady-in-waiting to Archduchess Isabella. She was later made countess of Erps. The couple had one son, Frans van Boisschot, Count of Erps, who married Anne Marguerite, countess of Lannoy. He had two granddaughters, from whom the counts of Konigsegg-Rothenfels-Erps descend.

Boisschot died in Brussels on 24 November 1649 and was buried in the Church of Our Blessed Lady of the Sablon.

=== Art patron ===
Boisschot commissioned Anthony van Dyck to paint a portrait of his wife, of which only copies survive. Van Dyck is believed to have painted a pendant portrait of Ferdinand van Boisschot himself of which various copies exist. A portrait of Boisschot auctioned by Sotheby's on 10 July 2014 in London (lot 168) (formerly in the collection of the Earl of Warwick) is believed by some art historians to be the lost original of this painting.

Boisschot also acquired from Van Dyck the painting Saint Martin Dividing his Cloak, presumably painted around 1618, which he donated to Saint Martin's Church in Zaventem.
