= Cargo B Airlines =

Belgian cargo airline

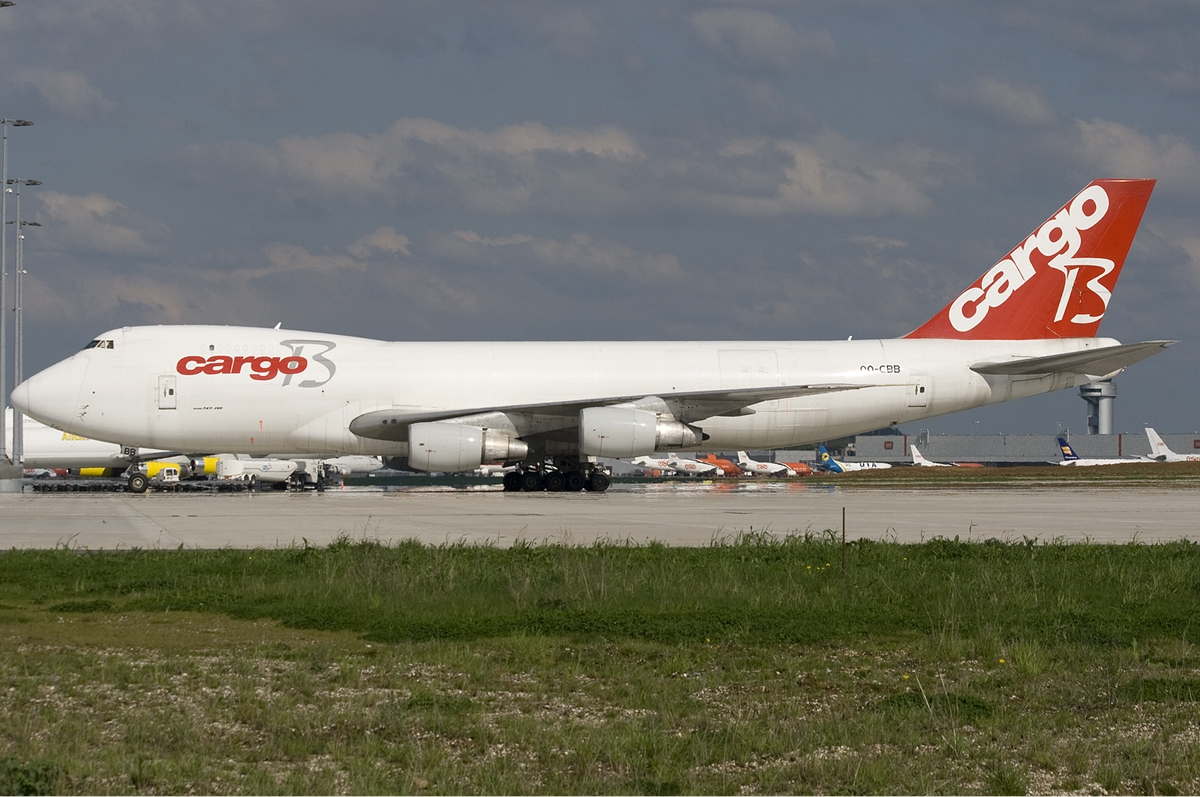
- Boeing 747-200F
IATA	ICAO	Call sign
BB	CBB	CARGO-BEE
- Founded: 2007
- Ceased operations: 2009
- Hubs: Brussels Airport
- Fleet size: 3
- Destinations: 10
- Headquarters: Zaventem, Belgium
- Key people: Rob Kuijpers (CEO)
- Website: http://www.cargob.com

Cargo B Airlines was a cargo airline with its head office in the Brucargo Building 706 in Zaventem, Belgium.

== History ==
The airline was founded by Rob Kuijpers, former CEO of Brussels Airlines and DHL. It started operations on October 14, 2007. In 2009 the company announced its move from Brussels Airport to Liège Airport, more flexible with its 24/7 opening hours. The airline ceased operations on July 1, 2009 after failing to receive tenders. On that same day Cargo B went bankrupt and terminated all operations.

== Destinations ==
=== Africa ===
Egypt

- Cairo (Cairo International Airport)

Gabon

- Libreville (Libreville International Airport)

Kenya

- Nairobi (Jomo Kenyatta International Airport)

Libya

- Tripoli (Tripoli International Airport)

Senegal

- Dakar/Yoff (Léopold Sédar Senghor International Airport)

South Africa

- Johannesburg (OR Tambo International Airport)

=== Americas ===
Argentina

- Buenos Aires (Ministro Pistarini International Airport)

Barbados

- Christ Church (Grantley Adams International Airport)

Brazil

- São Paulo (Viracopos-Campinas International Airport)

Colombia

- Bogotá (El Dorado International Airport)

Ecuador

- Latacunga (Cotopaxi International Airport)

Peru

- Lima (Jorge Chávez International Airport)

Trinidad and Tobago

- Tobago (Crown Point International Airport)

Venezuela

- Caracas (Simón Bolívar International Airport)

=== Europe ===
Belgium

- Brussels (Brussels Airport) (hub)

Spain

- Zaragoza (Zaragoza Airport)

== Fleet ==
- 2 Boeing 747-200F (OO-CBA and OO-CBB)
- 2 Boeing 747-400F (OO-CBC and OO-CBD) These aircraft were dry leased from Nippon Cargo Airlines and were used to replace the older Boeing 747-200F (OO-CBA and OO-CBB).

Boeing 747-200F (OO-CBA) was later written off after a tail strike at Brussels Airport on 27 October 2008.
