= Lord of Saventhem and Sterrebeke =

Two Heerlijkheden in Flanders

The Lords of Saventhem and Sterrebeke, currently Zaventem and Sterrebeek, were two Heerlijkheden in Flanders. The lords of Zaventem resided in Ter Meeren Castle.

== List ==
=== Lord of Saventhem and Sterrebeke ===
Early mentions prove that Saventem was property of the house of Crayenhem. The second familie that had owned Zaventem is considered the noble house of vander Meeren, for several centuries they resided in Zaventem.

Henri vander Meeren, Lord of Saventem,
died 1395: buys in 1381 Saventhem.

  1. Godfrey vander Meeren, Lord of Saventhem, died 1437:
    Married Catherine of Erps.
    1. Jean vander Meeren, Lord of Saventhem.
      1. Henri vander Meeren, Lord of Saventhem:
        Married to Anne of Cuyck.
        1. Philip I vander Meeren, Lord of Saventhem, died 1524:
          Married to Maximilienne van der Noot, Lady of WestWesel and Morchhoven.
          1. Henri vander Meeren, Lord of Saventhem
          2. Wauthier vander Meeren, Lord of Saventhem, died 1568;
            Married to Catherine of Nassau.
            1. Philippe II vander Meeren, Lord of Saventem, Sterrebeke and Westwesele:
              Married to Marie van der Noot
              1. William vander Meeren, Lord of Saventhem:
                Married to Joanne of Ullens

William sold Saventhem to Ferdinand van Boisschot

=== Barons of Saventhem ===
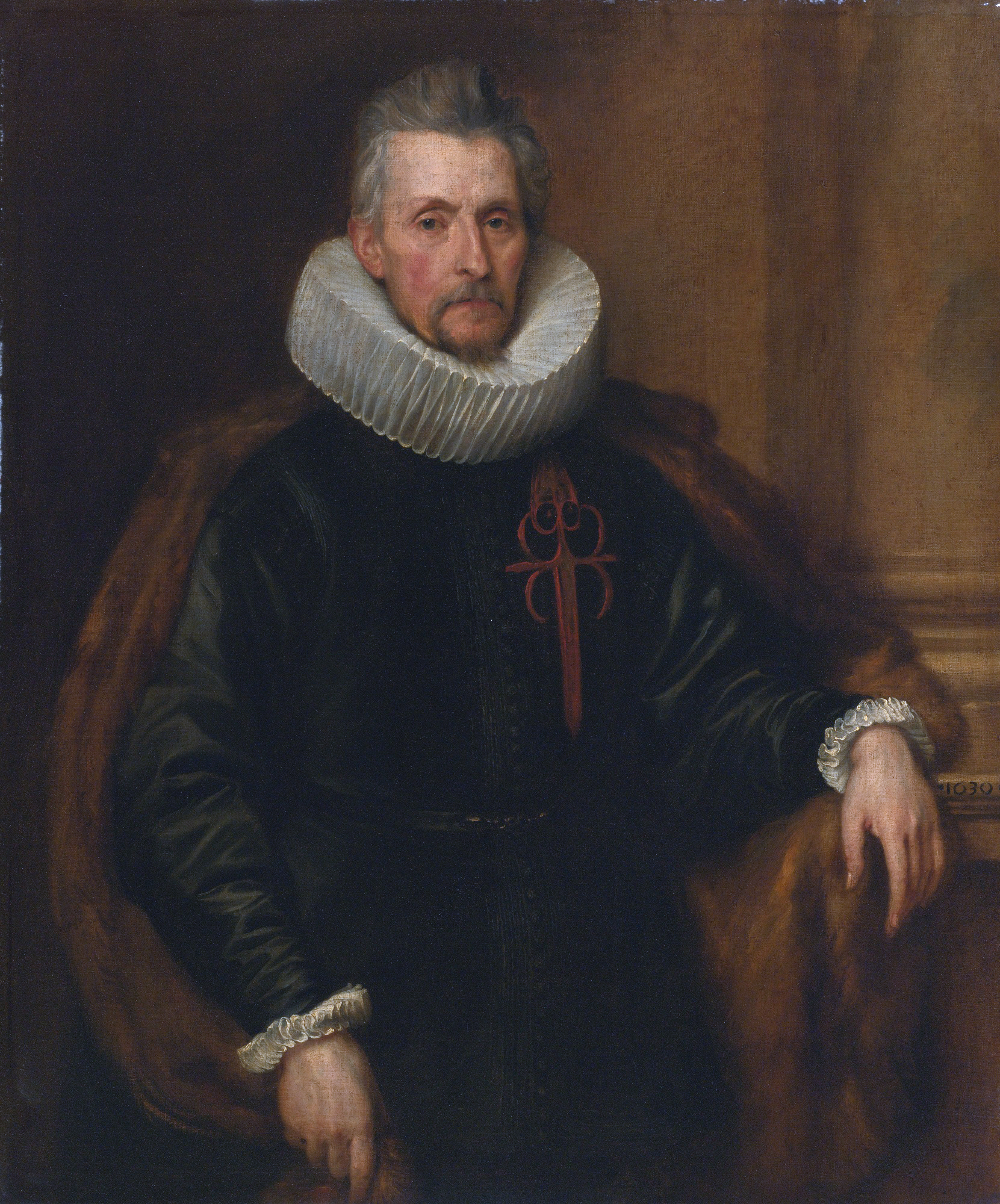
Ferdinand van Boisschot, 1st Baron of Saventhem attributed to van Dyck

In 1621 Ferdinand van Boisschot did buy Zaventem and Sterrebeek. He was created by grace of the sovereign 1st Baron of Saventhem in 1621. His descendants kept Saventhem until the French Revolution.

Ferdinand van Boisschot, 1st Baron of Saventhem and Sterrebeke.

  1. Frans van Boisschot, 2nd Baron of Saventhem:
    married to Adrienne-Florence de Lannoy.
    1. Charles Ernest François de Boisschot, 3rd Baron of Saventhem:
      married to Adrienne Florence, comtesse de Lannoy.
      1. Eugène Guislain Valentin de Boisschot, 4th Baron of Saventhem. Died without heirs.
      2. Hélène Hyacinthe Valentine Thérèse de Boisschot, Baroness of Saventhem x Karl Ferdinand, Graff von Königsegg-Rothenfels, a brother of Maximilian Friedrich von Königsegg-Rothenfels.
