= Brussels Elementary High School =

School in Brussels, Belgium

Coordinates: 50°51′49″N 4°28′55″E

- Brussels; Belgium

Information
- Type: Elementary through high school

Brussels Elementary High School, also known as Brussels Unit School, and formerly Brussels American School (BAS), is an elementary through high school of the Department of Defense Education Activity (DoDEA).

It opened in October 1967. It is located near Brussels, Belgium on a 17-acre (69,000 m^{2}) area in Sterrebeek, part of the municipality of Zaventem, Flemish Brabant.

The school serves as a DoDEA school for all US military and DOD civilian sponsor dependents, who are allowed to enroll their children tuition free. Non-DOD persons, including U.S., Belgian, and other citizens, are required to pay tuition. It celebrated its fortieth anniversary in late 2007. It also takes European students from Partnership for Peace (PfP) countries of NATO, to include Macedonia, Armenia, Azerbaijan, Georgia etc. Its proximity to NATO (North Atlantic Treaty Organization) helps serve as an opportunity for American children to enroll in a school taught to familiarize them with the American school system.
