= Zaventem =

- Municipality
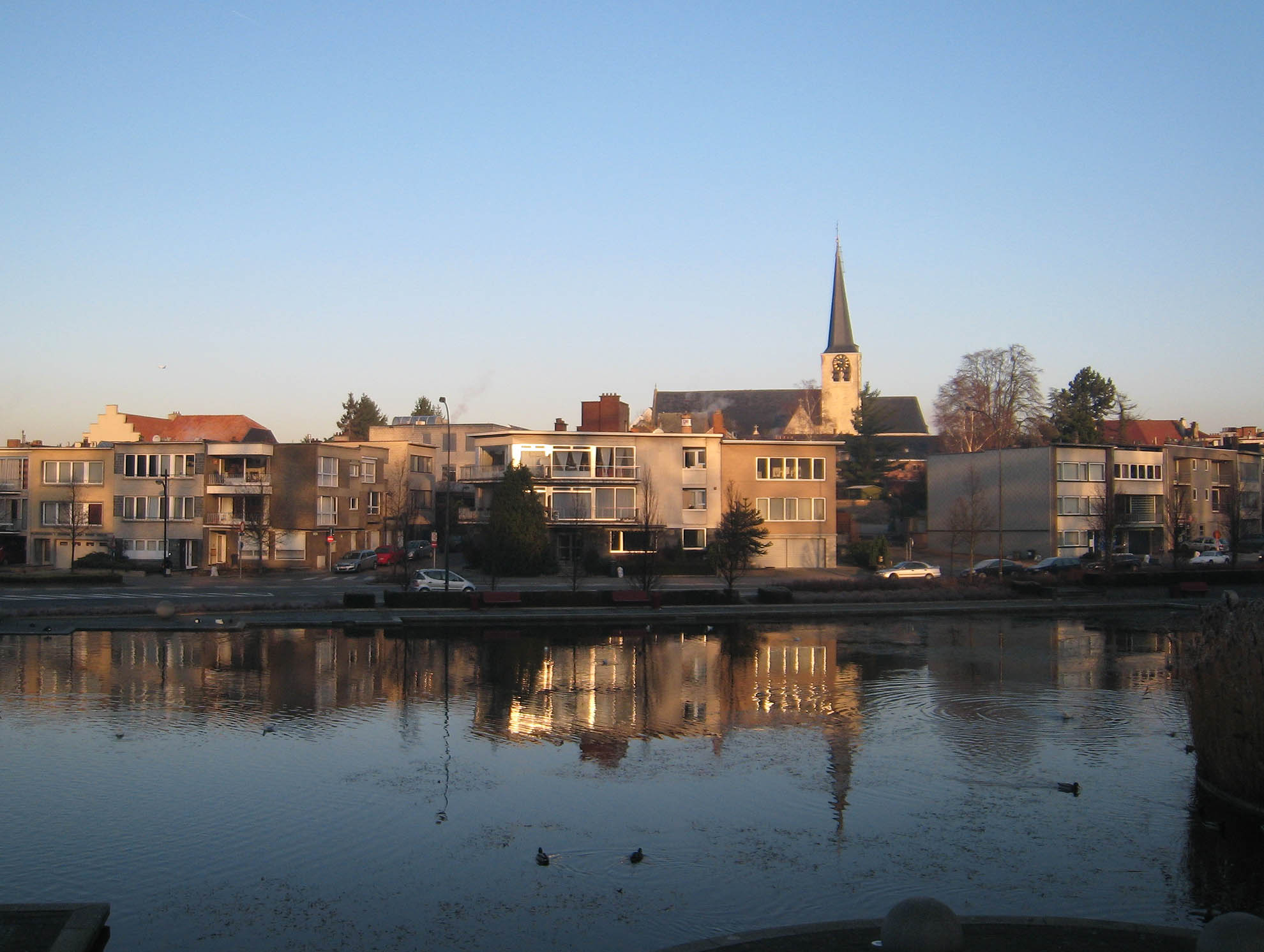

- Flag Coat of arms

- Location of Zaventem in Flemish Brabant
- Interactive map of Zaventem
- Location in Belgium
- Coordinates: 50°52′N 04°28′E
- Country: Belgium
- Community: Flemish Community
- Region: Flemish Region
- Province: Flemish Brabant
- Arrondissement: Halle-Vilvoorde

Government
  - Mayor: Dirk Phillips (Open Vld)
  - Governing parties: Open Vld, CD&V

Area
  - Total: 27.73 km^{2} (10.71 sq mi)

Population (2021-01-01)
  - Total: 35,184
  - Density: 1,269/km^{2} (3,286/sq mi)
- Postal codes: 1930, 1932, 1933
- NIS code: 23094
- Area codes: 02
- Website: www.zaventem.be

Zaventem (Dutch pronunciation: [ˈzaːvəntɛm]) is a municipality in the province of Flemish Brabant, in the Flemish region of Belgium. It is located in the Dijleland area, one of the three large recreational areas which together form the Groene Gordel ("Green Belt") around the Brussels-Capital Region. The municipality comprises the subdivisions or deelgemeenten of Nossegem, Sint-Stevens-Woluwe, Sterrebeek and Zaventem proper. The municipality is a suburb of Brussels, and Sint-Stevens-Woluwe directly borders the city, specifically the Woluwe-Saint-Lambert municipality.

On 1 January 2025, Zaventem had a total population of 37,271. The total area is 27.62 km^{2} (10.66 sq mi), which gives a population density of 1,037/km^{2} (2,690/sq mi). The official language of Zaventem is Dutch, as in the rest of Flanders. Zaventem is the home of Brussels Airport, together with neighbouring town of Diegem.

== Toponymy ==
The old spelling of the municipality's name is Saventhem, but the oldest notation of Zaventem is Saventa, which dates from records in 1117. There are several hypotheses on the meaning of the name. One of them refers to the seven pools or small ponds that existed in the area during medieval times. Another one refers to small ponds in a sandy environment (sabulous clay). Others interpret the name Zaventem as a reconfiguration of zeven tommen (meaning seven (Gallo-Roman) tumuli or burial mounds) or zaaivelden (meaning field for sowing).

== History ==
The earliest history of Zaventem goes back to the Neolithic and the Roman era. From burial remains it has become clear that the area also was inhabited during the times of the Frankish Empire and the Merovingian dynasty. Zaventem was part of the County of Ukkel and the County of Leuven successively before it was added to the Duchy of Brabant. Around the tenth century, Zaventem was owned by the Abbey of Nivelles. The village center arose at the crossing of two important roads between Vilvoorde and Tervuren, and between Brussels and Erps, with the church at the center of this growing village. The parish was established before the ninth century but the church, which was named after the patron saint Saint Martin, came to be owned by the Abbey of Nivelles at the end of the ninth century. In 1147 the right of ownership was transferred to the Diocese of Cambrai. The parish remained dependent on this diocese until 1559 after which the Archdiocese of Mechelen took it over.

=== Lords of Saventhem ===
From 1112 to 1122, the vassal of Lambertus de Craynhem, the Lord of Saventhem, was called Ricardus de Saventen. It has been thought that de Saventen was a local noble family that coexisted with the noble family of the de Craynhem overlords. At that time, Forest Abbey and the Abbey of Kortenberg were important landowners. The feudal heerlijkheid of Zaventem then came to be owned by the knight Hendrik van der Meeren only after it was owned by another noble family. In 1381, he was officially recognised as the Lord of Saventhem and his family continued to own it until 1605. They possessed a castle close to the parish church but this was broken down during the second half of the 1920s.

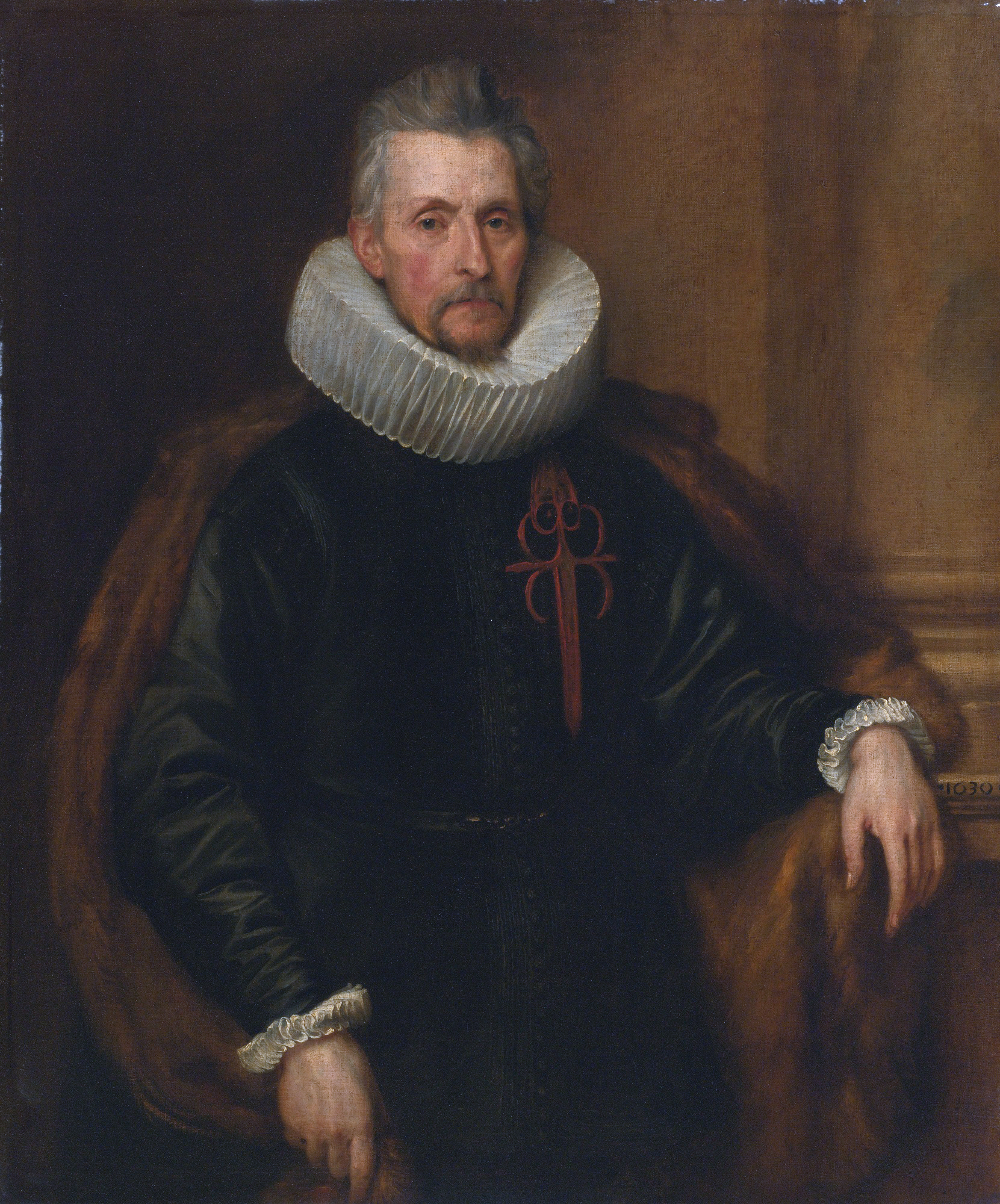
Ferdinand van Boisschot (1571–1649), 1st Baron of Saventhem, attributed to Anthony van Dyck (1630)

In 1605, the Chancellor of the Duchy of Brabant, Ferdinand van Boisschot (1560–1649) became the Lord of Zaventem, and when he was made a baron in 1621, Zaventem became a barony which subsequently expanded with the villages Nossegem, Sterrebeek and Sint-Stevens-Woluwe. The de Boisschot family remained the proprietor until the French Revolution.

Originally, there was a large forest northwest of Zaventem called Saventerlo where the Dukes of Brabant used to go hunting. The area was largely deforested in the 17th century. Nevertheless, Zaventem remained predominantly agricultural during the most part of the nineteenth century but its industrial activities go at least back to the 13th century. During this time, various water mills were installed on the Woluwe River that were later converted to paper mills. Initially, the river had many bends along its path in Zaventem which made the supply of energy from the water power rather difficult. In 1208, Godfrey, Duke of Brabant gave orders to alter and elevate the pathway of the Woluwe River so that the watermills would be supplied with a sufficient amount of water. This greatly benefited the paper industry later on in the 18th and 19th century.

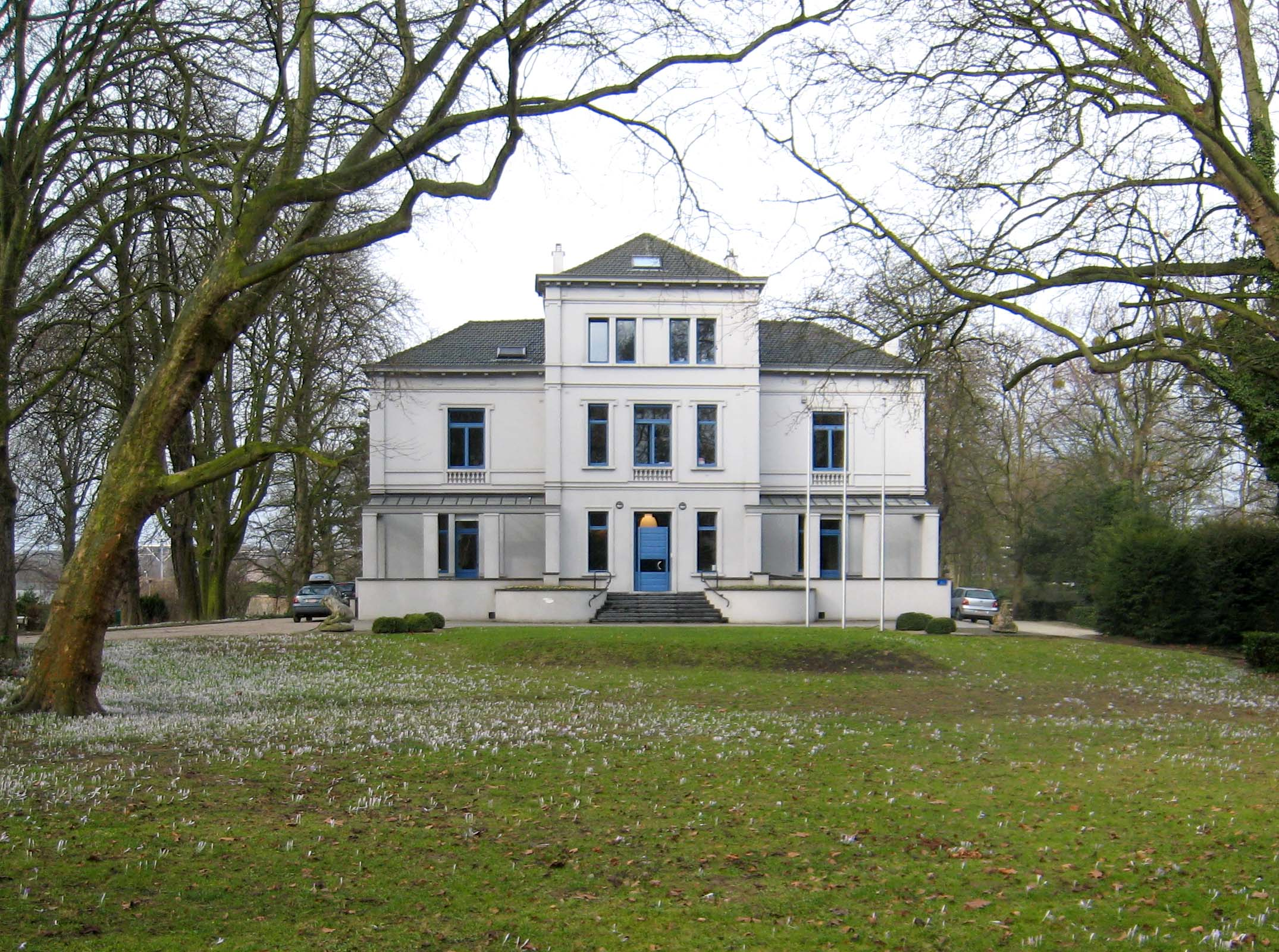
Zaventem municipal building, formerly the Feldheim Villa

From the 18th century however, Zaventem gradually changes from an agricultural community to an industrial community. Especially the construction of the road between Leuven and Brussels from 1705 to 1710, contributed to this evolution. From 1850, the development of steam engines even intensified the process of industrialisation, having a negative effect on agricultural activities. Gradually, the large leasehold estates of farmland were replaced in the 19th century by houses of labourers. In 1866, the railway track between Brussels and Leuven, as a sign of the industrial era, was inaugurated splitting Zaventem into two parts. In addition to the paper industry, industrial activity also started to revolve around the tanning of leather in the late 19th century. At the start of the 20th century, the car manufacturer Excelsior, that would become world-renowned later on, produced some of its cars in a factory in Zaventem. All these industrial initiatives prompted the building of various small castles and grand villas in the municipality for the executive directors of the companies such as the Feldheim Villa of the wealthy eponymous family that was involved in the tanning industry. After World War II, however, many of the factories were forced to close, unable to keep up with foreign competition.

With the building of Brussels Airport at the occasion of Brussels World's Fair in 1958, the features of Zaventem's landscape have been altered drastically. The location used to be the place of the large Saventerlo Forest. Nevertheless, the airport gave a tremendous boost to local employment that benefited Zaventem greatly. Added to that the strong growth of semi-industrial companies during the 1960s and 1970s Zaventem became an important economic hub.

== 2016 Brussels bombings ==
During the 2016 Brussels bombings, two explosions took place in Brussels Airport, Zaventem, 22 March 2016 at 07:58 local time. One near the American Airlines and Brussels Airlines check-in desks and one next to a Starbucks coffee shop. A third bomb was found in the airport and was detonated by a controlled explosion. The airport was to remain closed until 24 March but was extended till 28 March. Flights bound to Brussels Airport were either canceled or diverted to nearby airports such as Brussels South Charleroi Airport, Ostend–Bruges International Airport, and Schiphol. At 09:11 CET an explosion took place at Maelbeek/Maalbeek metro station. ISIL claimed responsibility for the attacks as an act of revenge against Belgium for participation in the ongoing Military intervention against ISIL.

== Places of interest ==
=== Church of Saint Martin and Anthony van Dyck's masterpiece ===
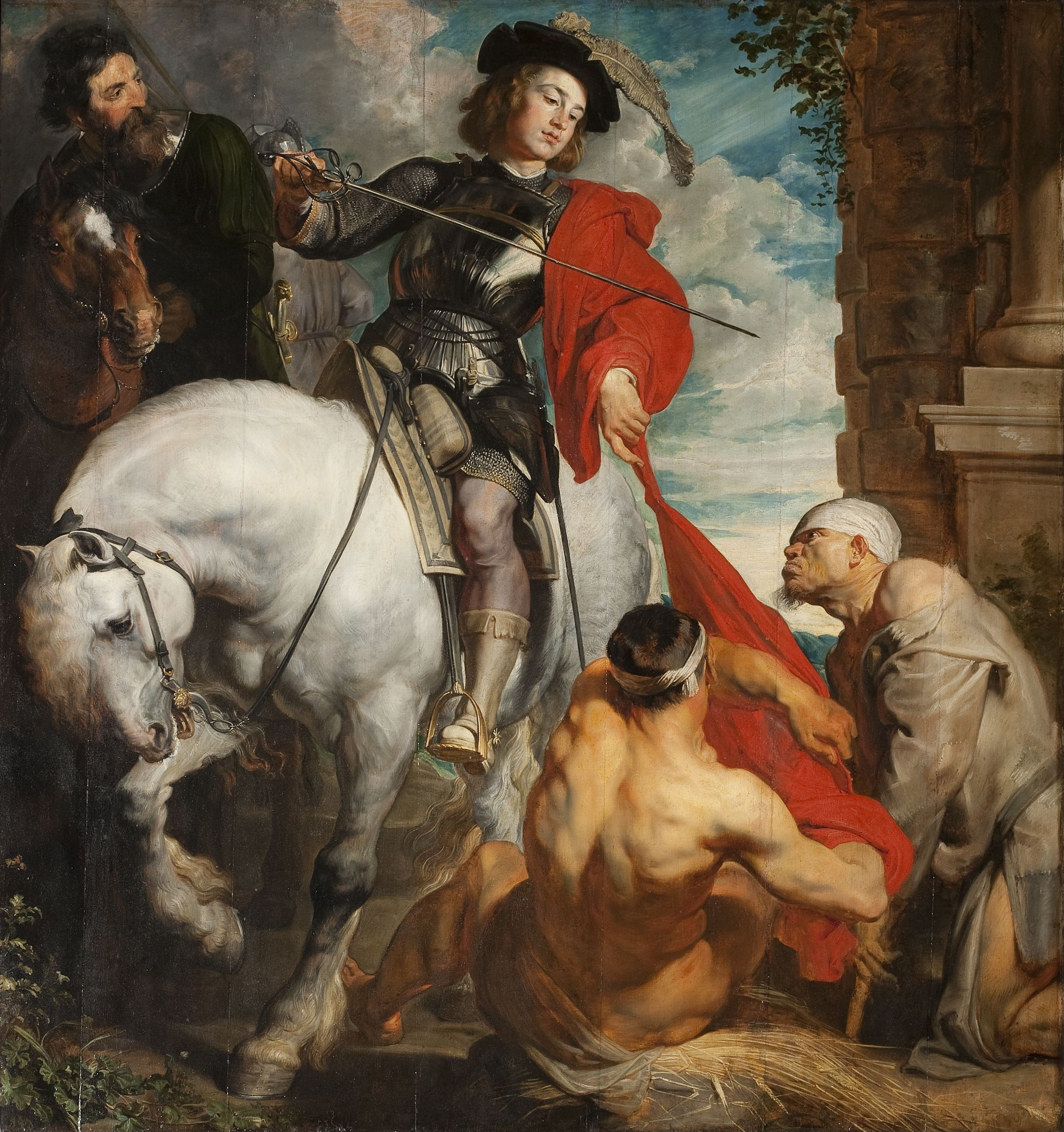
Saint Martin Dividing his Cloak by Anthony van Dyck in the Church of Saint Martin

The Church of Saint Martin, named after Saint Martin of Tours, was built in 1567 and has been a protected monument since 1938. Originally, the church was a typical basilical church in Romanesque architecture with three naves, an eastern tower and an apse. In the 16th century, the church was converted into a Gothic building and further enlarged in the 19th century. It contains a 1618 painting of Saint Martin Dividing his Cloak, which was installed in 1621.

=== De Veste Museum of Local History ===
The museum exhibits objects that are mainly loaned from a society for local history. They are primarily old objects that were used in the past, such as weighing instruments, threshing and transport material, archival pieces regarding local societies, municipal governments and economic activities. In addition, there are artefacts that were used for farming purposes and folkloric instruments of craftsmen and other professions. Furthermore, there are also artefacts relating to the monarchy, the church life, the world wars and historiographical accounts and flags of Zaventem. Outside large agricultural instruments are exhibited like ploughs, and harvesting machines to grub up chicory. The building of the museum was erected in 1957 as a storage place in the architectural style of a 17th-century house to refer to the houses that used to be in the area during that century. In 1977, the building was fully restored and converted into the local history museum.

=== Mariadal Castle ===
The Mariadal Castle in the municipal park was built at the end of the 19th century by the archeologist Baron Emile de Munck. It contains two building layers and seven bays, one of which being occupied by the round tower. The roof has several dormers. The building has been used for different purposes such as a public secondary school, horeca businesses, and the offices of the Public Centre for Social Welfare. In 1988 the complex was renovated and reopened as a cultural community center. The location of the castle used to be the place where the 17th century homestead Hof van Ophem stood (and still partially exists). On the terrain used to be a homestead that functioned as a fief of the Duke of Brabant. It depended on the old ter Meeren Castle of the eponymous Lords of Zaventem. Because of various hereditary separations, the homestead went its own way and was sold to noblemen from Brussels in the 16th century. The domain was reunited in the 17th century.

=== House of the Seven Knights ===
The House of the Seven Knights ("Huis der Zeven Ridders") is a building from the 17th century and was the property of the du Bois or vanden Bossche family. It therefore was called the vanden Bossche House (Huize vanden Bossche) and unrightfully the House of the Seven Knights. In 1312, the ruling vander Meerens family from Sterrebeek acquired a fief homestead called The Seven Fiefs of Wezembeek that were sold to Ferdinand van Boisschot in the 17th century. In several charters there is a mentioning of the Seven Hereditary Lords of Zaventem and the Sevenantship of Wesembeeck (Seventnantschap van Wesembeeck) who decided on important decisions so they possibly controlled the homestead at some point. It is wrong, however, that the vanden Bossche House is called the House of the Seven Knights considering that the former is a mansion from the 17th century. Because of their multitude of properties the vanden Bossche family was highly regarded amongst the people, which may explain the confusion.

=== Stockmans Mill ===
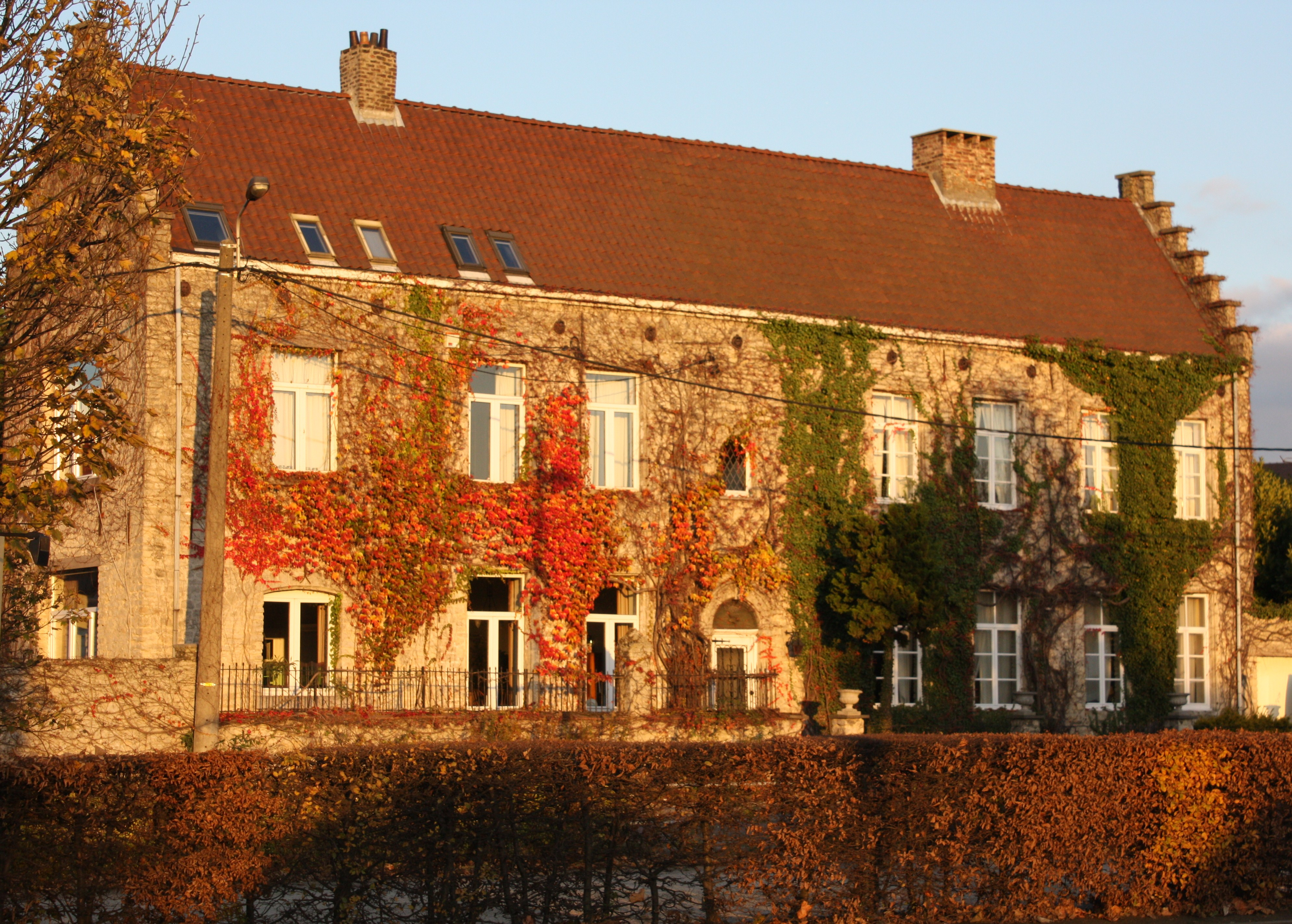
House with built heritage status, formerly the ter Beke Court

The Stockmans Mill (Stockmansmolen) is the only watermill that is left in Zaventem. Its history goes back to the 13th century when during the time of Henry III, Duke of Brabant the mill was mentioned in an official document of 1249. Around 1450, this mill company belonged to the van der Beke family, which is why it was called the ter Beke Mill, at that time adjacent to the ter Beke Court. The court and the mill were separated in the 16th and 17th century due to a series of inheritances and sales. From 1675 until the beginning of the 19th century, the mill remained the property of the highly esteemed vanden Bossche family. In 1807 the mill was sold to Karel de Velder. When during the Belgian Revolution of 1830, Dutch troops were stationed in the fields along the Woluwe River between Zaventem and Sint-Stevens-Woluwe, miller Karel de Velder stopped the water from flowing through in order to flood the fields and the Dutch would retreat. The mill subsequently became the property of the Stockmans family after Karel de Velder's granddaughter married Jan Philippe Stockmans, hence the name "Stockmans Mill". The watermill was used to grind the grains, and later it was also used as a paper mill. Watermills contributed greatly to the early industrialisation of the area. It remained functioning until the mid-20th century but its condition decreased gravely. A private owner bought it and renovated it in the end of the 1980s to convert it into a restaurant and tavern. Stockmansmolen is now a popular burger restaurant.

== Infrastructure ==
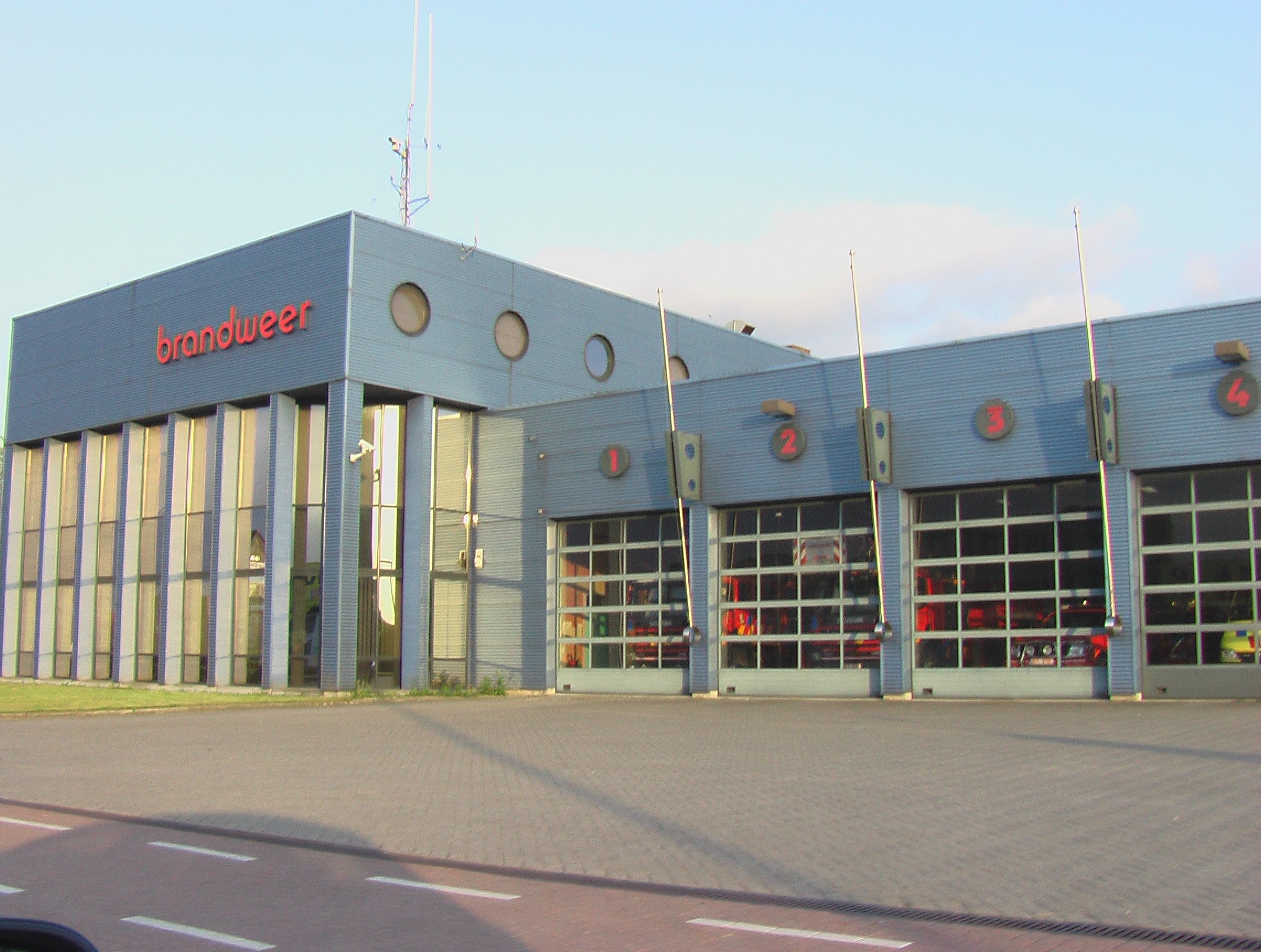
Zaventem Fire Department

The Zaventem Fire Department (Brandweer Zaventem) provides fire protection services.

Railway stations in the municipality include Zaventem, Brussels Airport and Nossegem.

The municipality contains a major road intersection where the Brussels Ring (R0) meets the A3 (towards Leuven and Liège); the junction on the ring road serving the town is further north, while the intersection with the A201 serving the airport (and labelled Zaventem) is actually located within Machelen.

== Economy ==
European Air Transport has its head office in Building 4–5 on the grounds of Brussels Airport and in Zaventem. Belgium's airspace is generally considered to be the busiest and most complex of Europe.

Ingersoll Rand has its European headquarters in the Alma Court building in Sint-Stevens-Woluwe, Zaventem.

=== Former companies ===
When it existed, Virgin Express had its head office in Building 116 on the grounds of Brussels Airport and in Zaventem. SN Brussels, which formed in 2002, had its head office in Airport Building 117 when it existed. Prior to its disestablishment, Sabena had its head office in the Sabena House in Zaventem. Prior to its disestablishment, Sobelair had its head office in Building 45 on the grounds of the airport and in Zaventem. When Trans European Airways existed, its head office was in Building 117 of Melsbroek Airport. When CityBird existed its head office was in Building 117D in Melsbroek Airport in Zaventem. When Cargo B Airlines existed, its head office was in the Brucargo Building 706 in Zaventem.

== National airport ==
Brussels Airport is the national airport of Belgium. It covers an area of 1245 hectares with about 225,000 flight movements and at least 19 million passengers annually, therefore making it the largest airport in Belgium. The airport is located in the province of Flemish Brabant on the municipal territory of Zaventem, Machelen and Steenokkerzeel, and it is run by the Brussels Airport Company, previously known by the abbreviation BIAC. The Belgian capital Brussels is at a distance of 12 km (7 mi) and it is easily accessible both by car and by public transport, including train, bus and taxi. You can take the train and hop off directly at the airport or park your car in a nearby parking facility. The airport is easily accessible by train from various cities. Not only from Belgian cities, but also from international cities like Paris or Amsterdam.

=== History ===
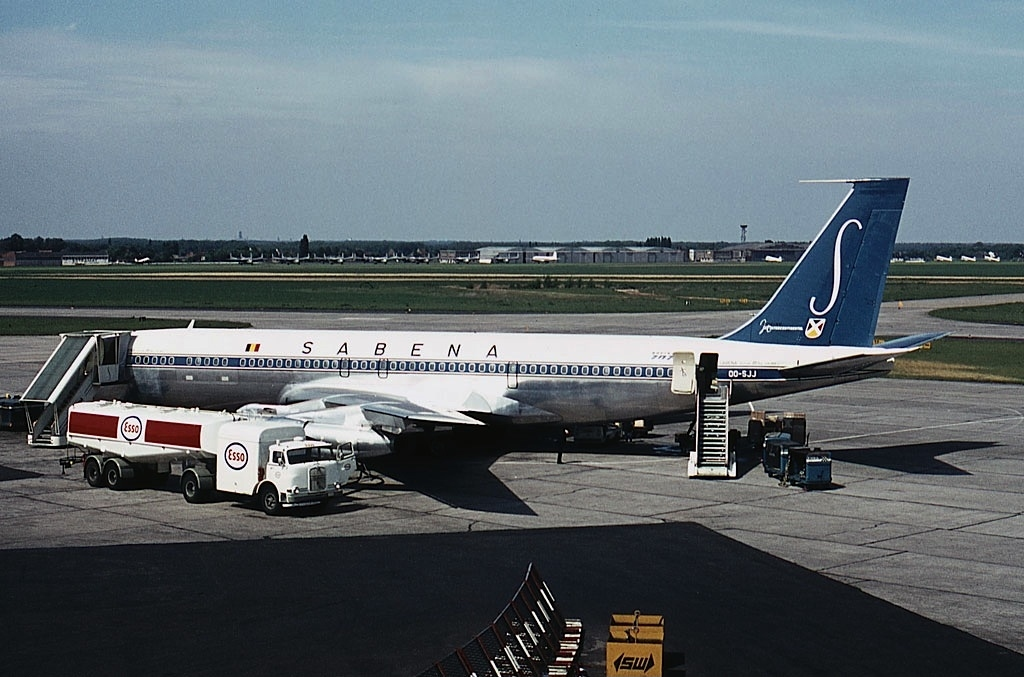
A Boeing 707-329C of Sabena at Zaventem National Airport in 1966

The home of the national airport originates in the municipality of Evere. During the First World War, the German occupier started building an 'airfield' there because of the proximity of Brussels, the connection to the road to Haacht and the flat terrain. After the war, however, the airfield came into the hands of the Belgian air force.

At the end of the 1930s, the Belgian Ministry of Defence purchased land in Melsbroek to build a new airfield. Shortly after, the Second World War broke loose during which the Germans set up an airport in Melsbroek during the occupation.

Only starting the 1950s, Zaventem was chosen by the Belgian government as the location for a national airport. Even Melsbroek was too small, especially taking the number of visitors of Brussels World's Fair of 1958 into account. The Melsbroek premises were now made available to the air force.

The buildings of the Zaventem airport were designed in 1956-1958 by Maxime Brunfaut, Georges Bontinck and Jos Moutschen. It was initially estimated that it should have a maximum capacity of 6 million passengers per year. The 1950s were characterised by an uncurbed belief in technological progress. This was translated into the architecture by using such materials as aluminium, concrete, steel, and glass. The transit hall was intended as a striking feature with a space of a 100m long, 55m wide and 18m high, covered with a curved roof structure out of aluminium. Over the years, expansions and adjustments were made, leading to the loss of much of the original design. In 1994, Pier B was put into use so that 21 million passengers could be handled annually. Pier A was opened in 2002 to ensure a better flow and increased passenger comfort, processing another 25 million passengers annually.

== Education ==
Schools in Zaventem include Gemeentelijke (community) as well as catholic primary and secondary schools, and Gemeentelijke Academie voor Muziek, Woord en Dans. Brussels American School (A United States Department of Defense Education Activity school for dependents of United States Department of Defense personnel assigned to NATO) is in Sterrebeek.

Zaventem has a library.

== Parks and recreation ==
Seven parks are located in Zaventem.

== International relations ==
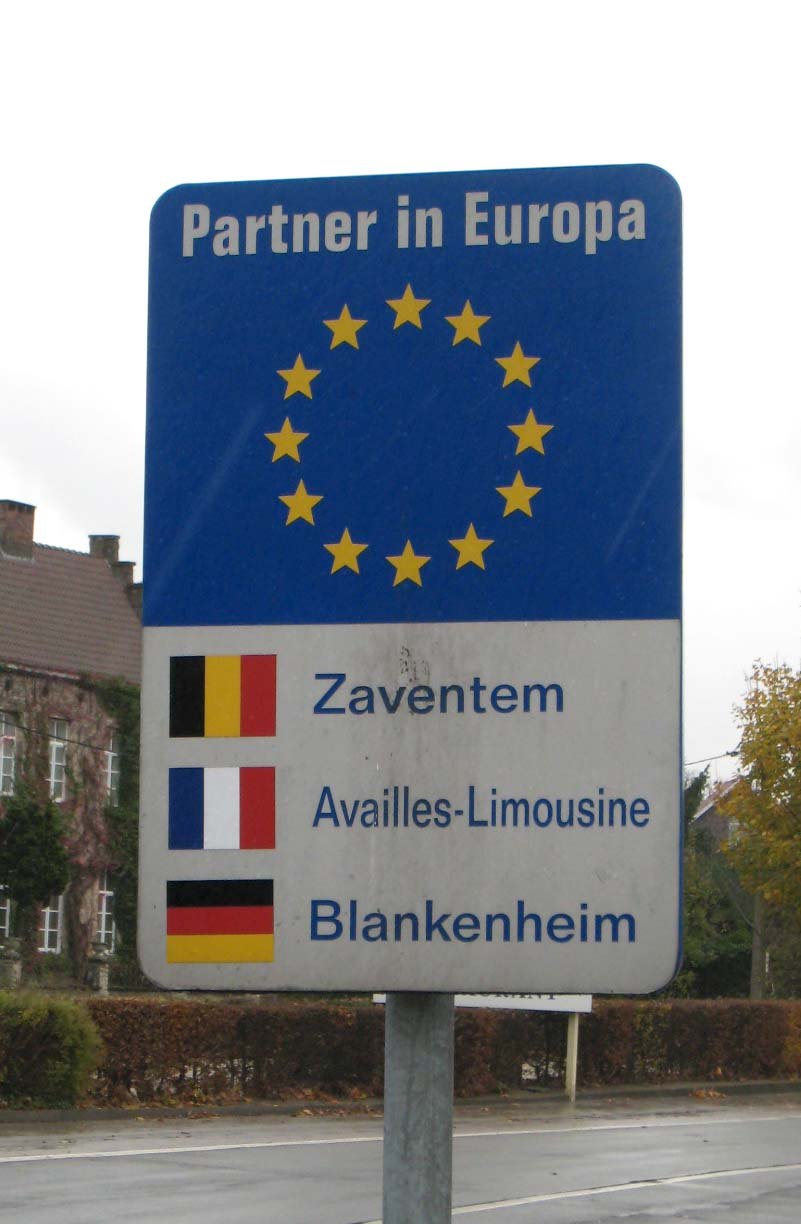
Zaventem's twin towns

=== Twin towns – Sister cities ===
Zaventem is twinned with:

- Availles-Limouzine, France
- Blankenheim, Germany
- Kronberg im Taunus, Germany.
- Zugló, Hungary

== Gallery ==
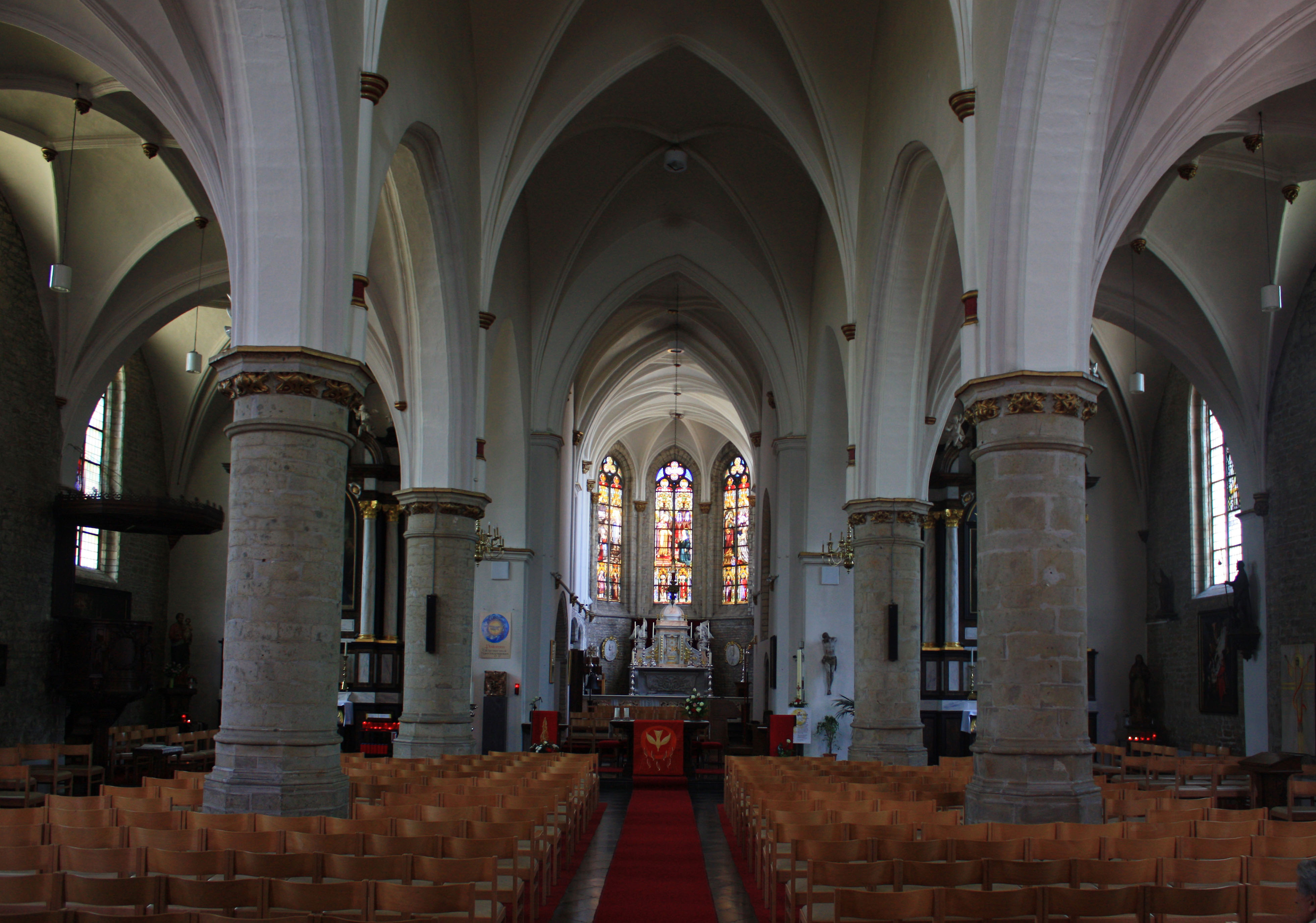
Inside the Church of Saint Martin, Zaventem

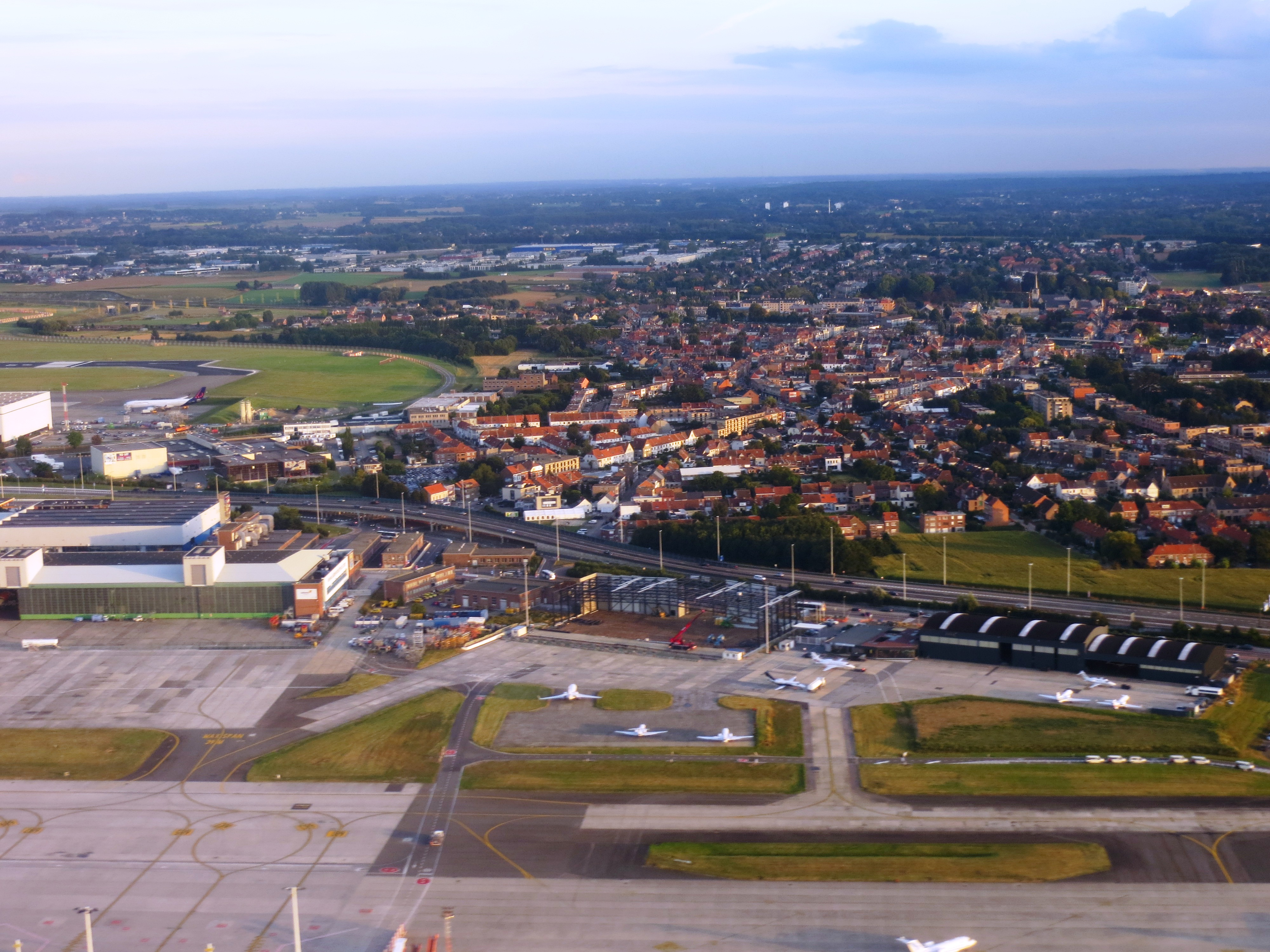
Aerial photo of Zaventem

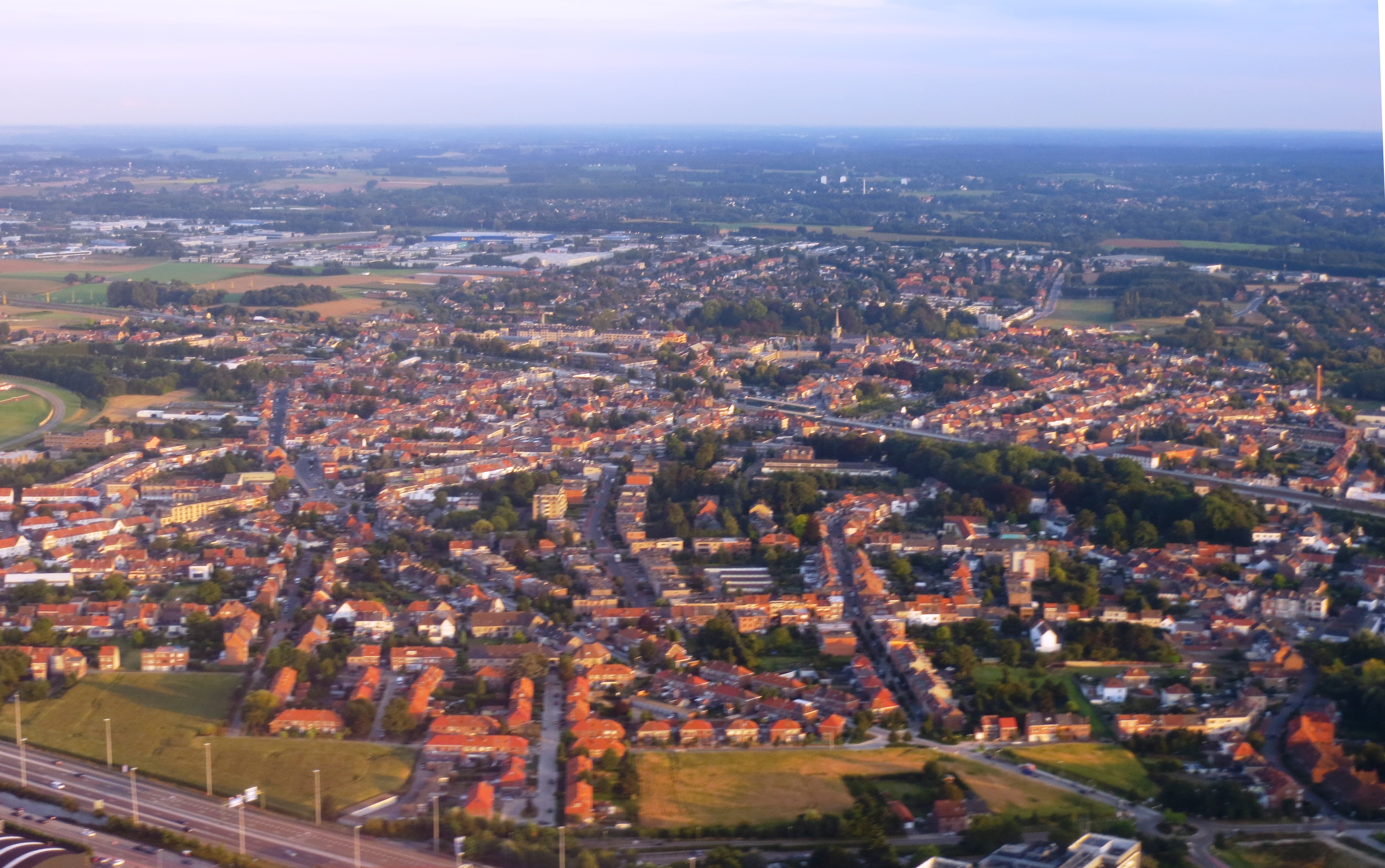
Aerial photo of Zaventem

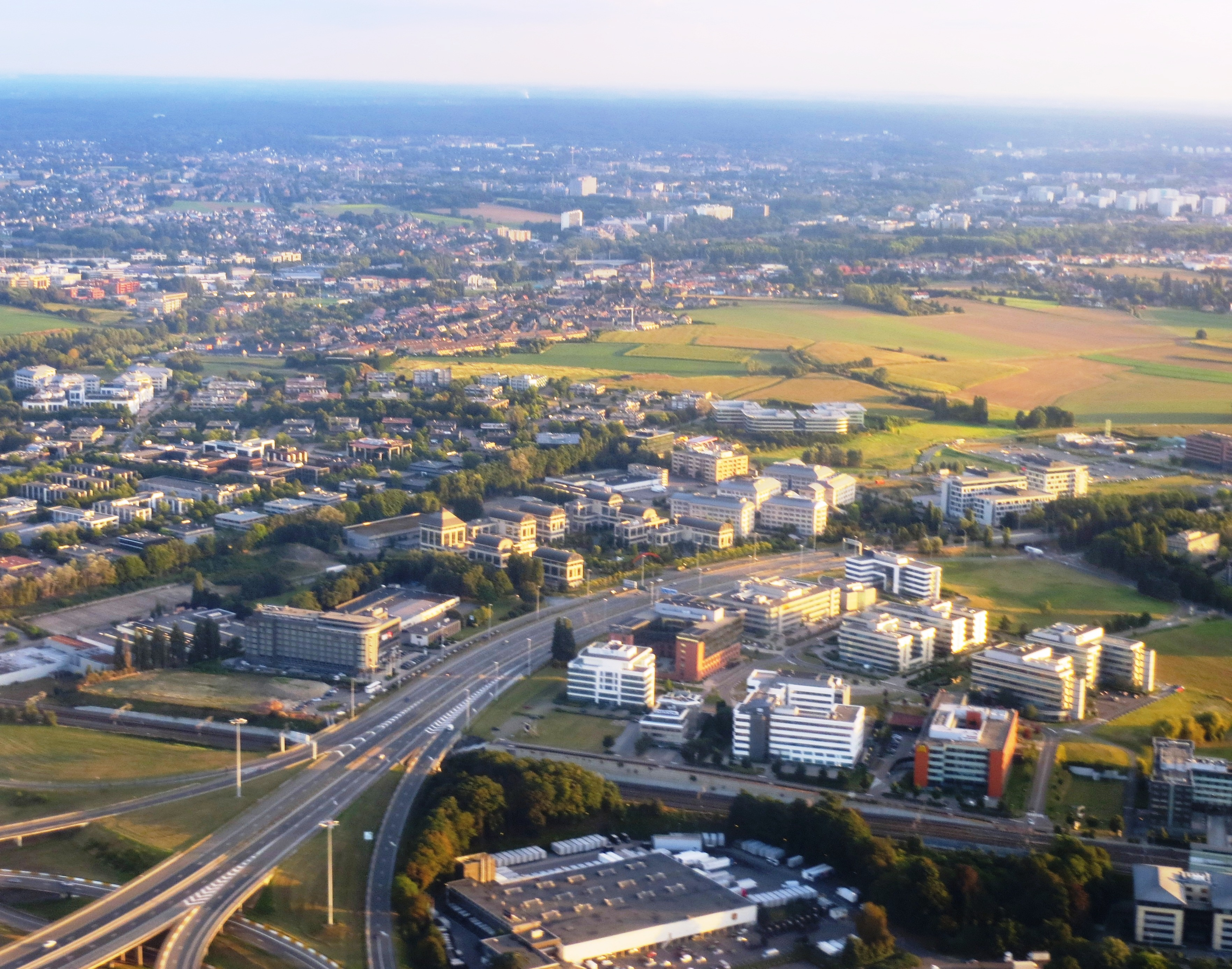
Aerial photo of Zaventem

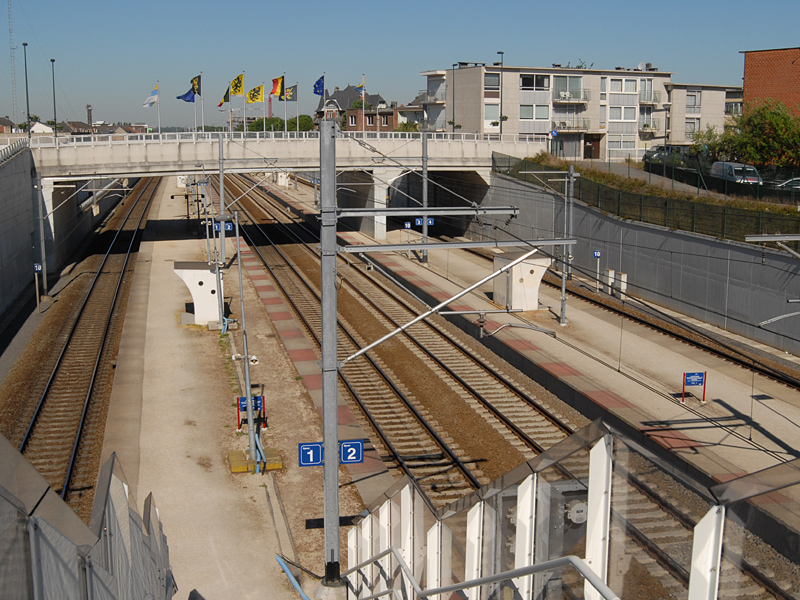
Zaventem railway station

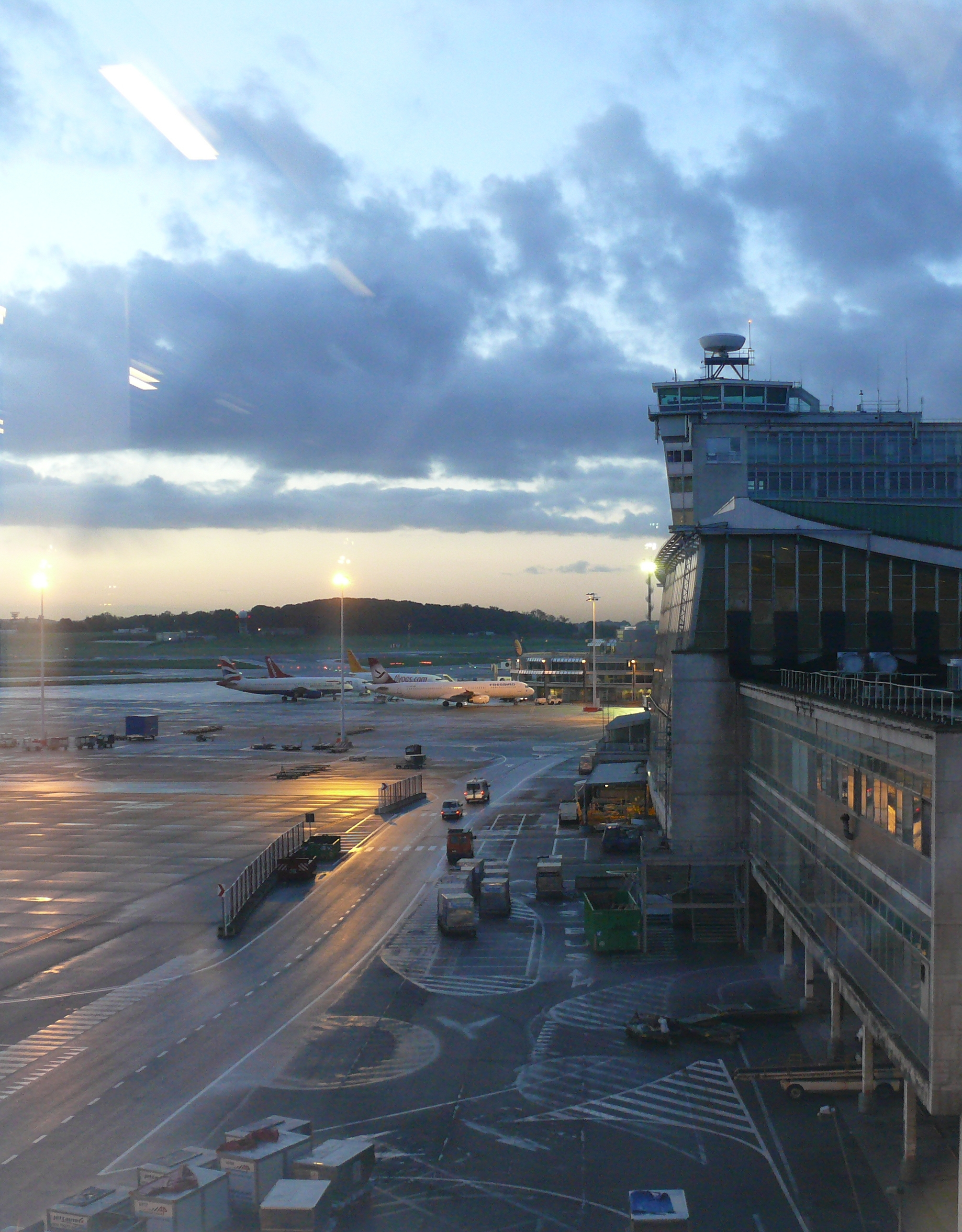
Brussels Airport

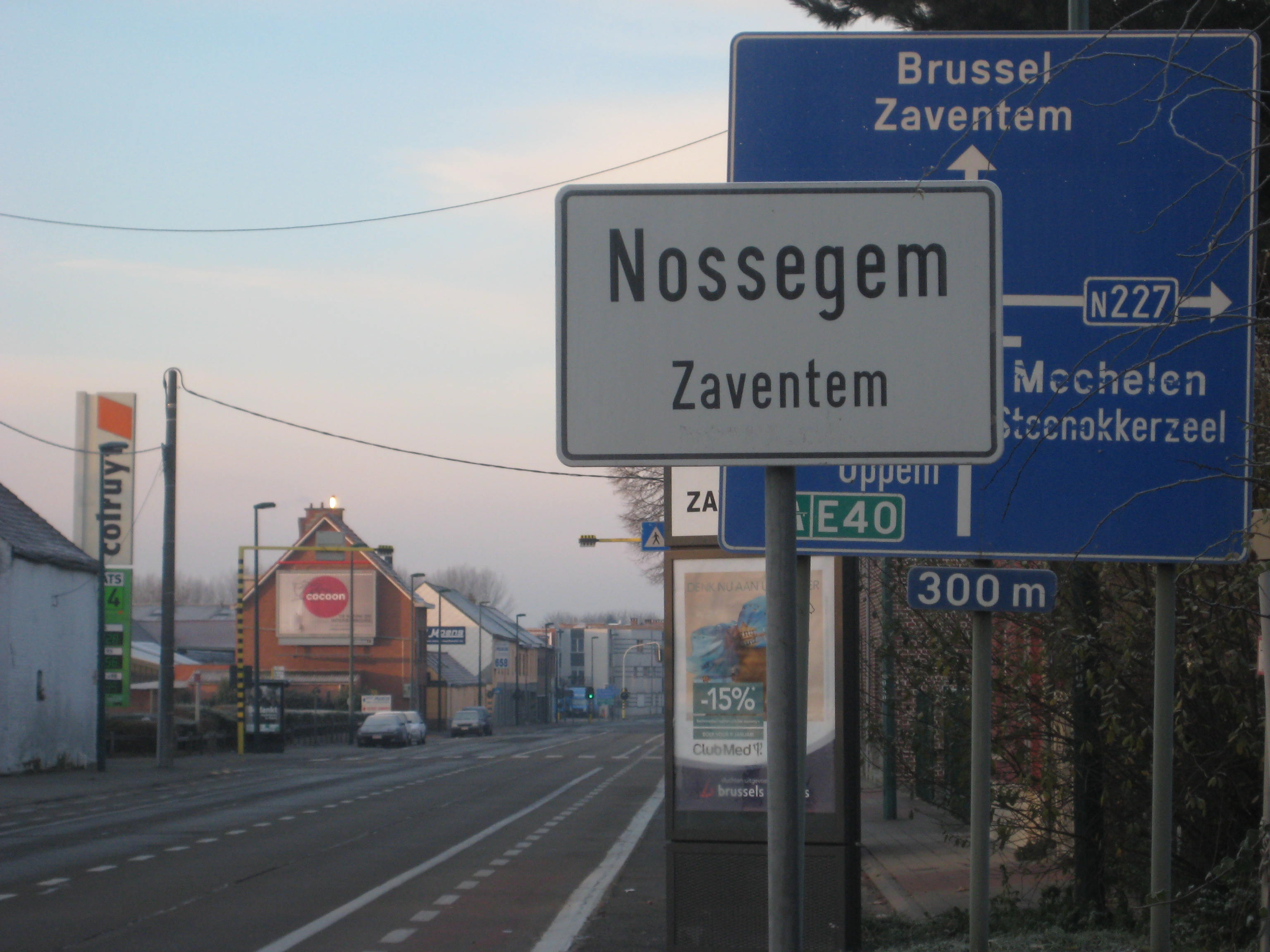
The main road between Brussels and Leuven in Nossegem

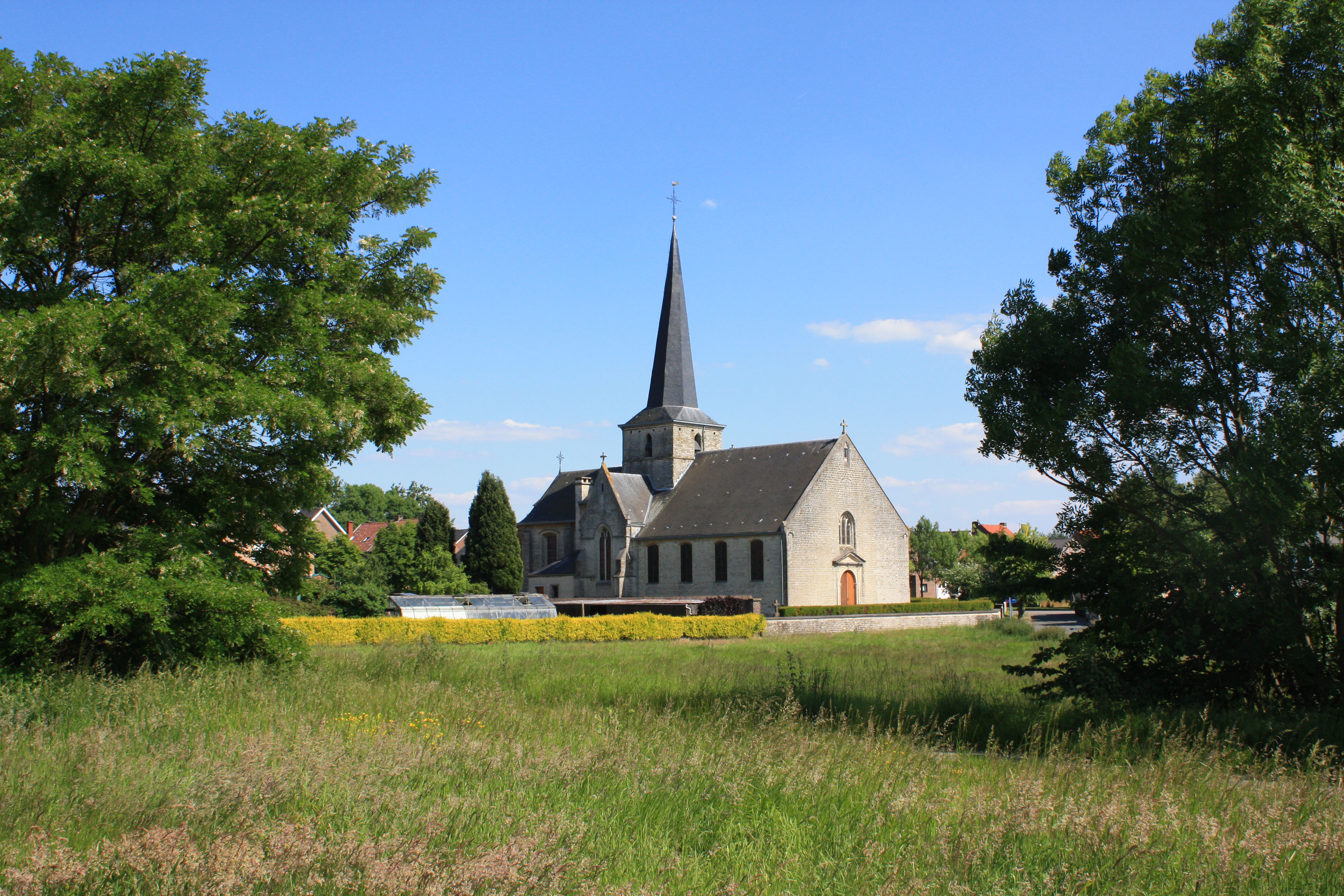
The Church of Saint Lambert, Nossegem

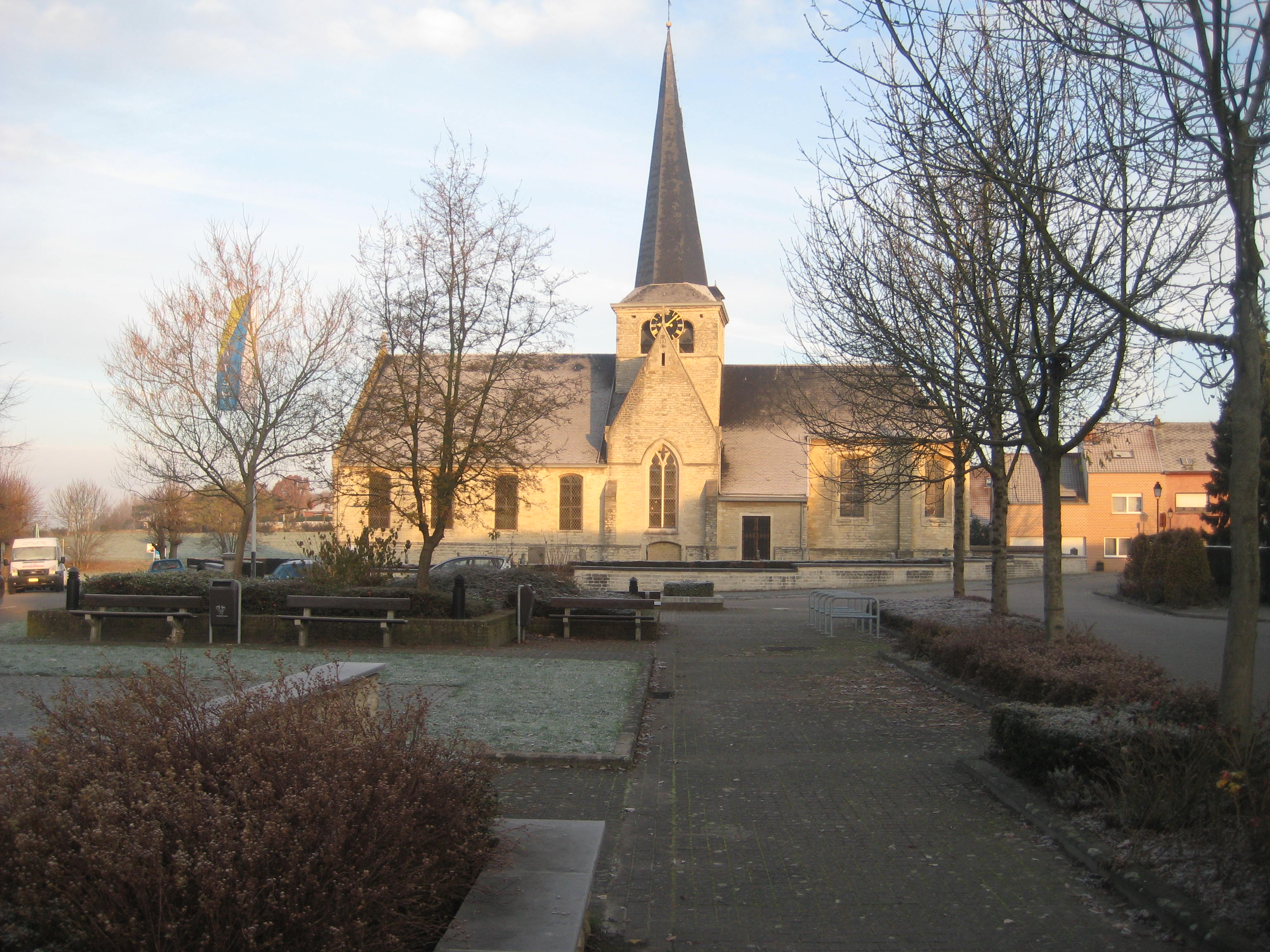
The Church of Saint Lambert, Nossegem

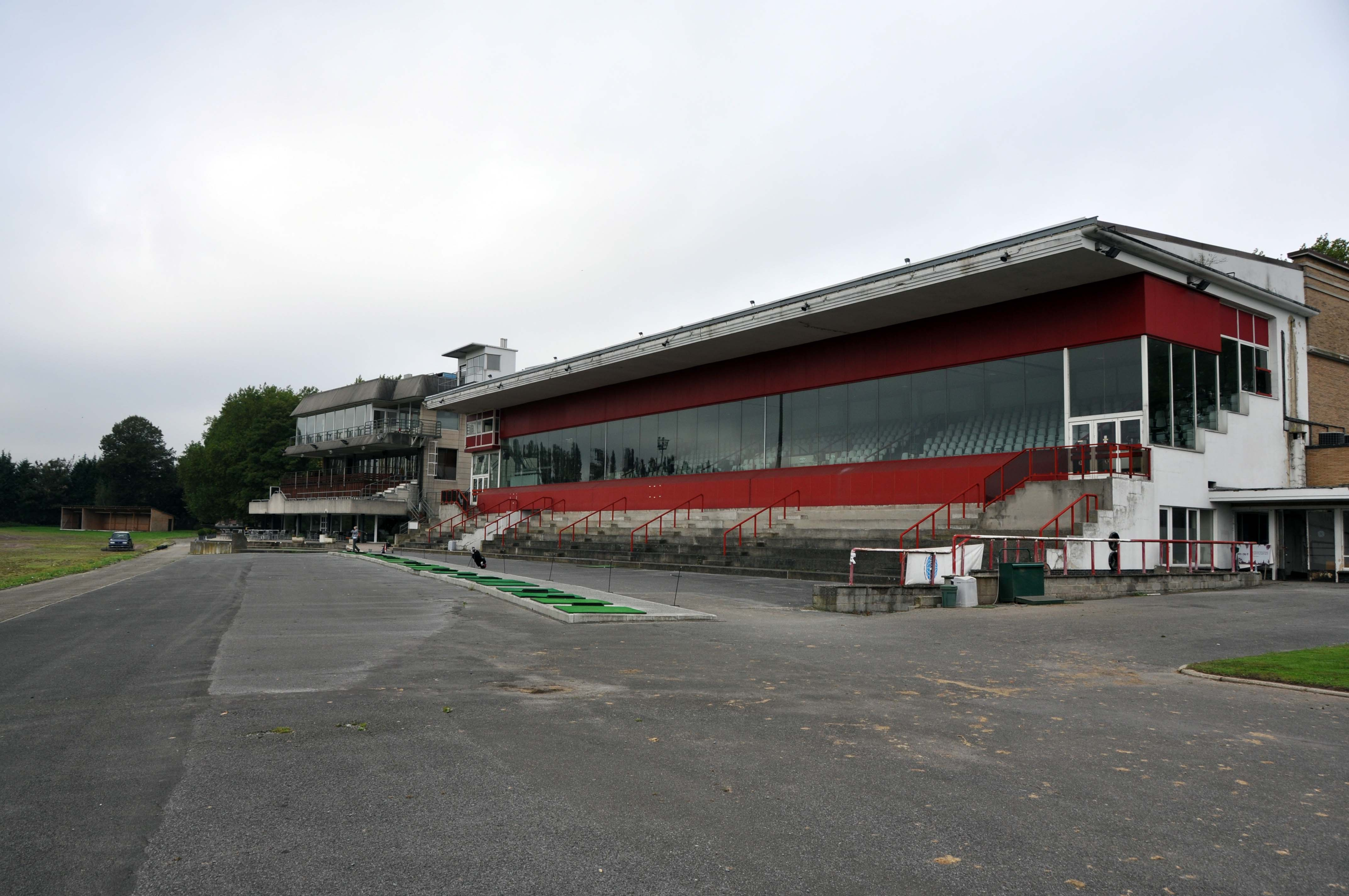
The hippodrome of Sterrebeek

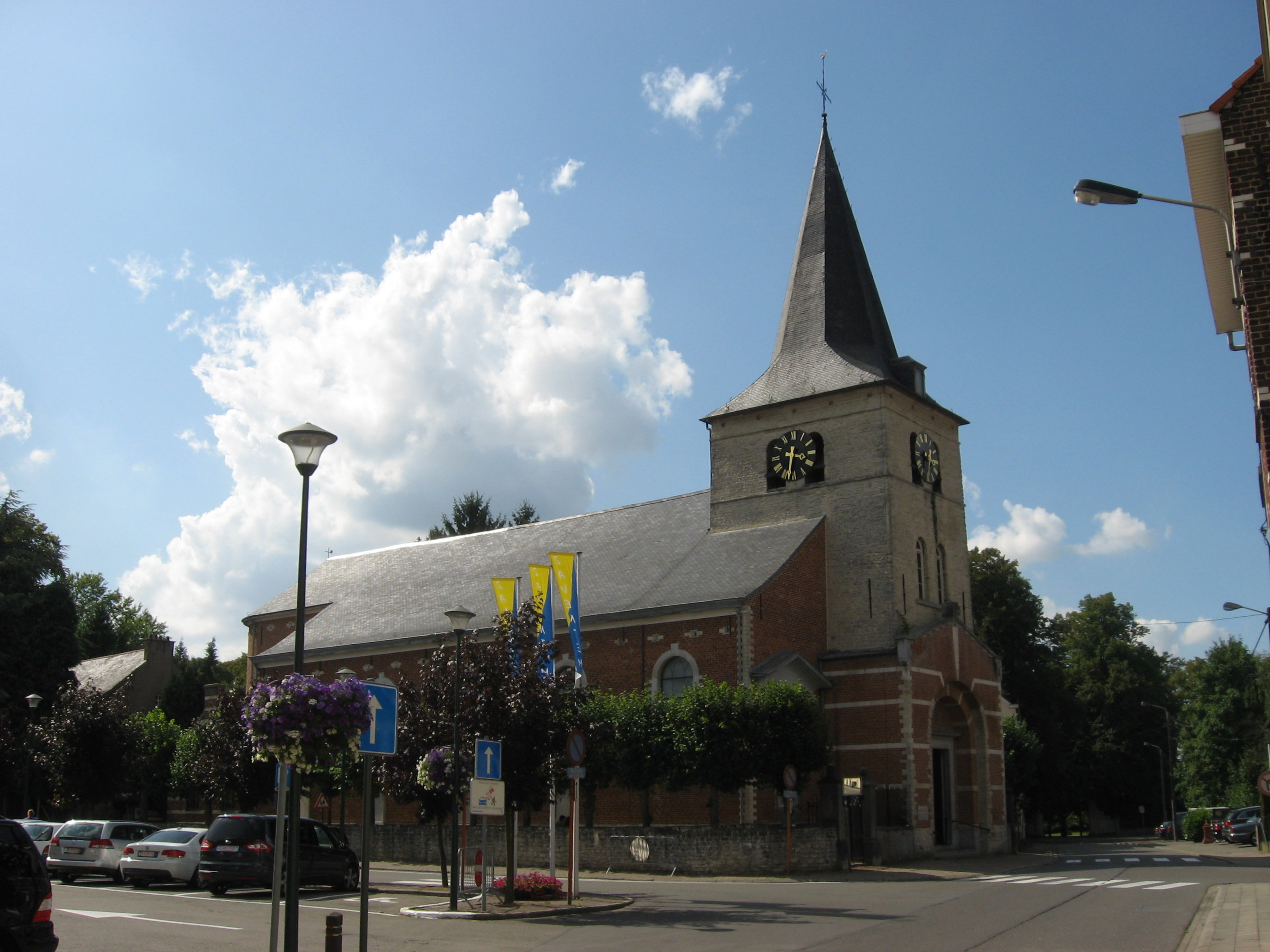
The Church of Saint Pancras, Sterrebeek

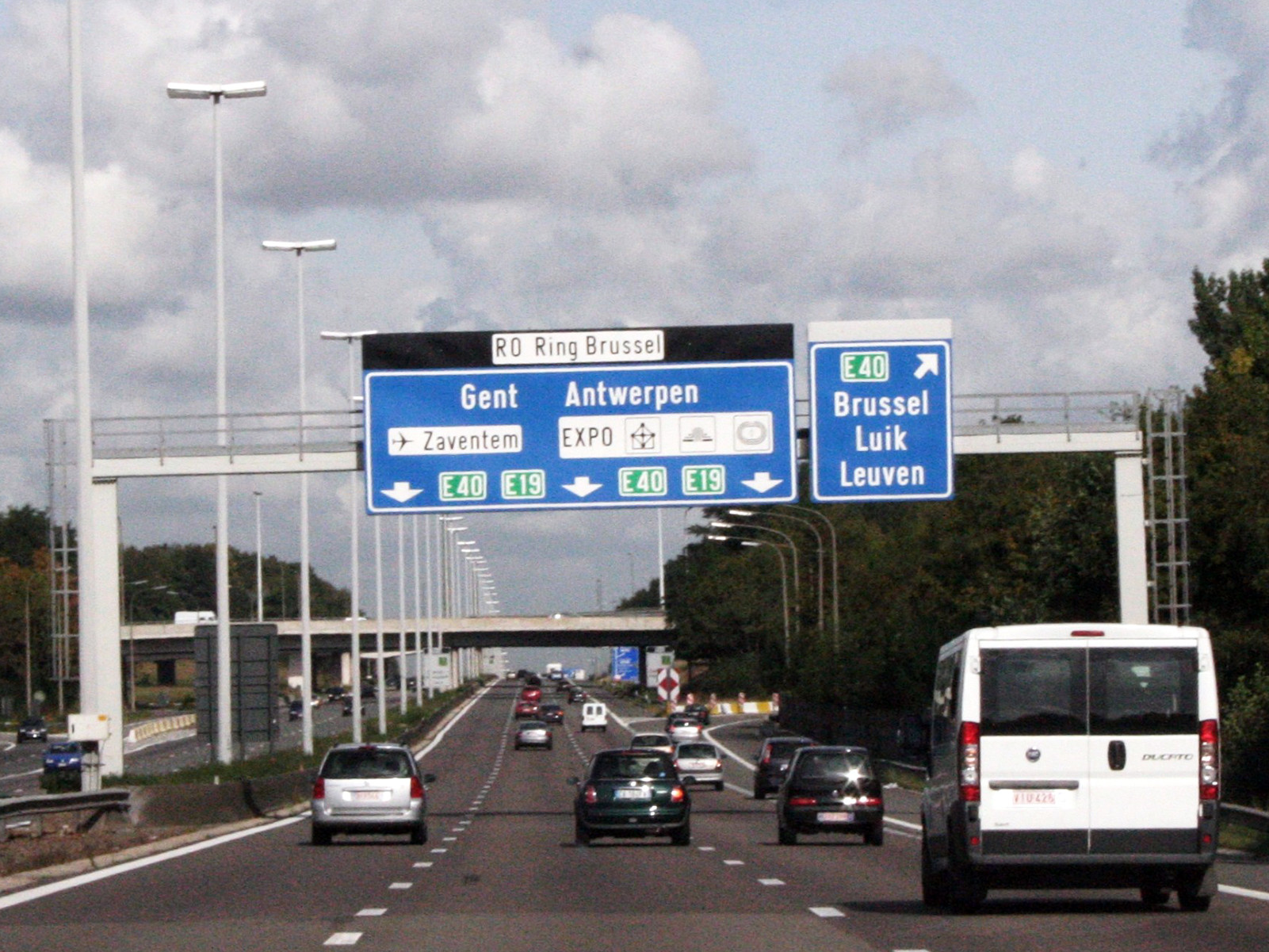
The ring road of Brussels in Sint-Stevens-Woluwe

== See also ==
List of mayors
