= Saint Martin Dividing his Cloak (van Dyck) =

Painting by Anthony van Dyck

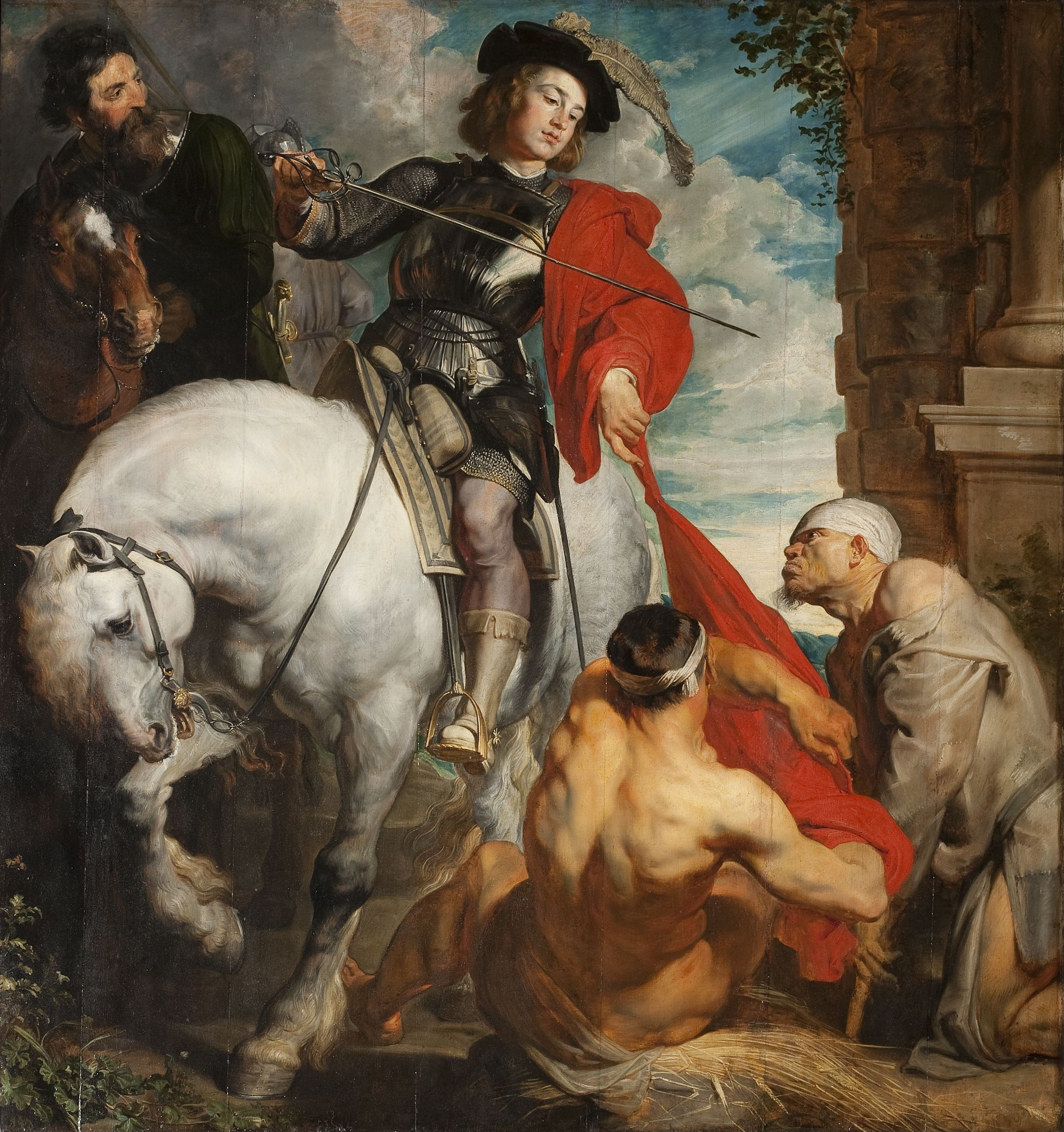
- Artist: Anthony van Dyck
- Year: c. 1618
- Type: Oil on panel
- Dimensions: 171 cm × 157.5 cm (67 in × 62.0 in)
- Location: Sint-Martinuskerk (Saint Martin's Church), Zaventem, Belgium

St Martin Dividing his Cloak is a painting by the Flemish painter Anthony van Dyck dated around 1618, which is an altarpiece in the Sint-Martinuskerk (Saint Martin's Church) in Zaventem, Belgium. The painting portrays the story of Saint Martin sharing his cloak with a beggar. This early work of van Dyck was painted when he was strongly influenced by Rubens's style.

== Depicted story ==
The painting depicts a scene from Sulpicius Severus's biography of the fourth-century Christian Saint Martin of Tours. The young Martin was according to legend a soldier serving in the army of Constantine the Great stationed in the French city of Amiens. On a winter's day while riding out of the city gates he saw a poor man shivering from the cold. He promptly cut his cloak in half and gave one half to the beggar. That night while asleep he had a vision of Christ wearing the part of the cloak which he had given to the beggar. Christ told the angels who surrounded him: "See how Martin has covered me with his cloak." Martin, who had converted to Christianity as a child but had become a soldier at his father's behest, then left the military to devote his life to the Christian faith.

== Description ==
The painting shows the youthful Martin wearing armour and a hat sitting on his white horse. He has almost entirely cut his fire-red cloak in two with the sword in his right hand, while a naked beggar sitting on the ground to the right is pulling at one half of the cloak. Another beggar in rags on the right of the first one is kneeling while he supports himself with crutches. Behind these two figures is a section of wall with ivy and a column, suggesting a city gate. At the top left behind St Martin is an older man on horseback who is looking at the scene with an expression of astonishment. Behind the two riders is the silhouette of a man with a helmet and beyond this a sky with clouds, which creates the illusion of depth and vastness.

This work is regarded as one of van Dyck's most Rubensian paintings: not only are the figures close to those of Rubens, but also the brushwork is influenced by Rubens. Instead of van Dyck's characteristic loose brushstroke, a smooth and opaque paint treatment was used, creating a very sculptural effect. The red color of the cloak, the light and dark flesh colors, bluish in the shadow and the whites and grays in the horse are also typical for Rubens' style.

== History ==
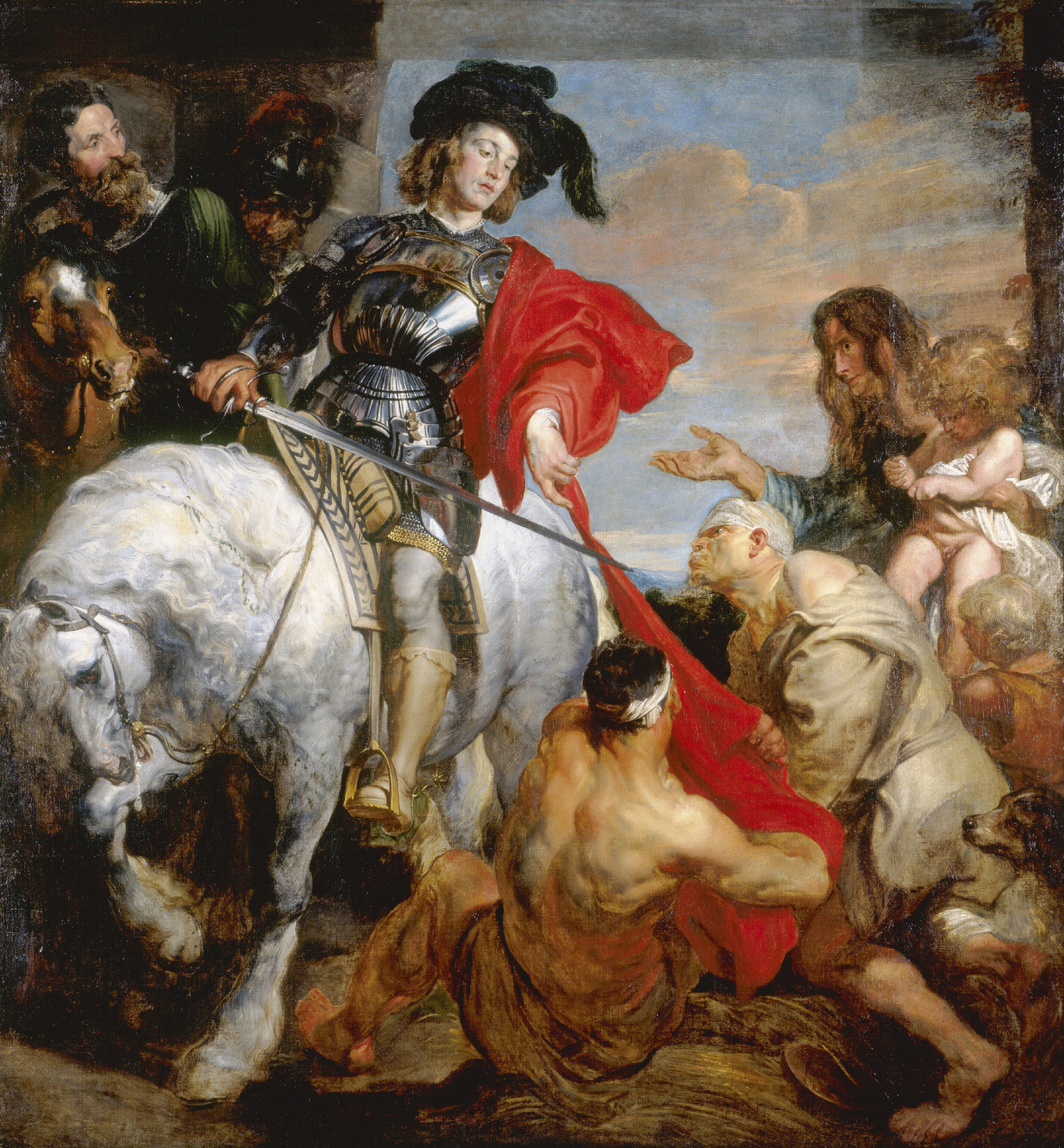
St Martin Dividing his Cloak, Royal Collection

Julius Held has suggested that the Zaventem commission was first given to Rubens and that Rubens even produced a preliminary sketch but later handed the commission over to van Dyck, who was then an assistant in Rubens' workshop. The painting was then completed by van Dyck around 1618 and remained in his studio until it was installed in the Zaventem church in 1621. In 1621 the Chancellor of Brabant, Ferdinand van Boisschot wanted to donate a painting to the local parish church in Zaventem dedicated to St Martin. He commissioned a painting of the saint from van Dyck who then used the existing painting to fill the order. According to a story, which has been debunked, van Dyck would have delivered the painting to van Boisschot en route from Antwerp to Italy when he decided to stay for some time in Zaventem as he had fallen in love with a pretty local woman named Anna van Ophem.

The painting was temporarily moved to the residence of Baron van Boisschot in Brussels during the military campaigns of French king Louis XIV around 1672. It was, on the orders of the French government, removed from the church and taken in August 1794 to Paris where it was subsequently exhibited in the Musée Central in the Louvre. The work was repatriated in 1815 after the defeat of the French and returned to the church in 1816.

== 1620 version in the Royal Collection ==
A later, larger (243.1 x 242.5 cm) version of the painting on canvas is kept at Windsor Castle as part of the Royal Collection. This version dates from around 1620 and was probably left behind in Rubens' studio after van Dyck's departure that year. Several copies after this version exist, indicating it was still in Antwerp and available for other artists to copy. It was in Spain by the 1740s, where it was bought by Mr Bagnols and subsequently by Frederick, Prince of Wales before September 1747.

In the Royal Collection painting the group of beggars was extended to include a woman, two children and a dog. The poses of the principal figures also differ between the two pictures.

== See also ==
- List of paintings by Anthony van Dyck
