= Cotopaxi International Airport =

Airport in Ecuador

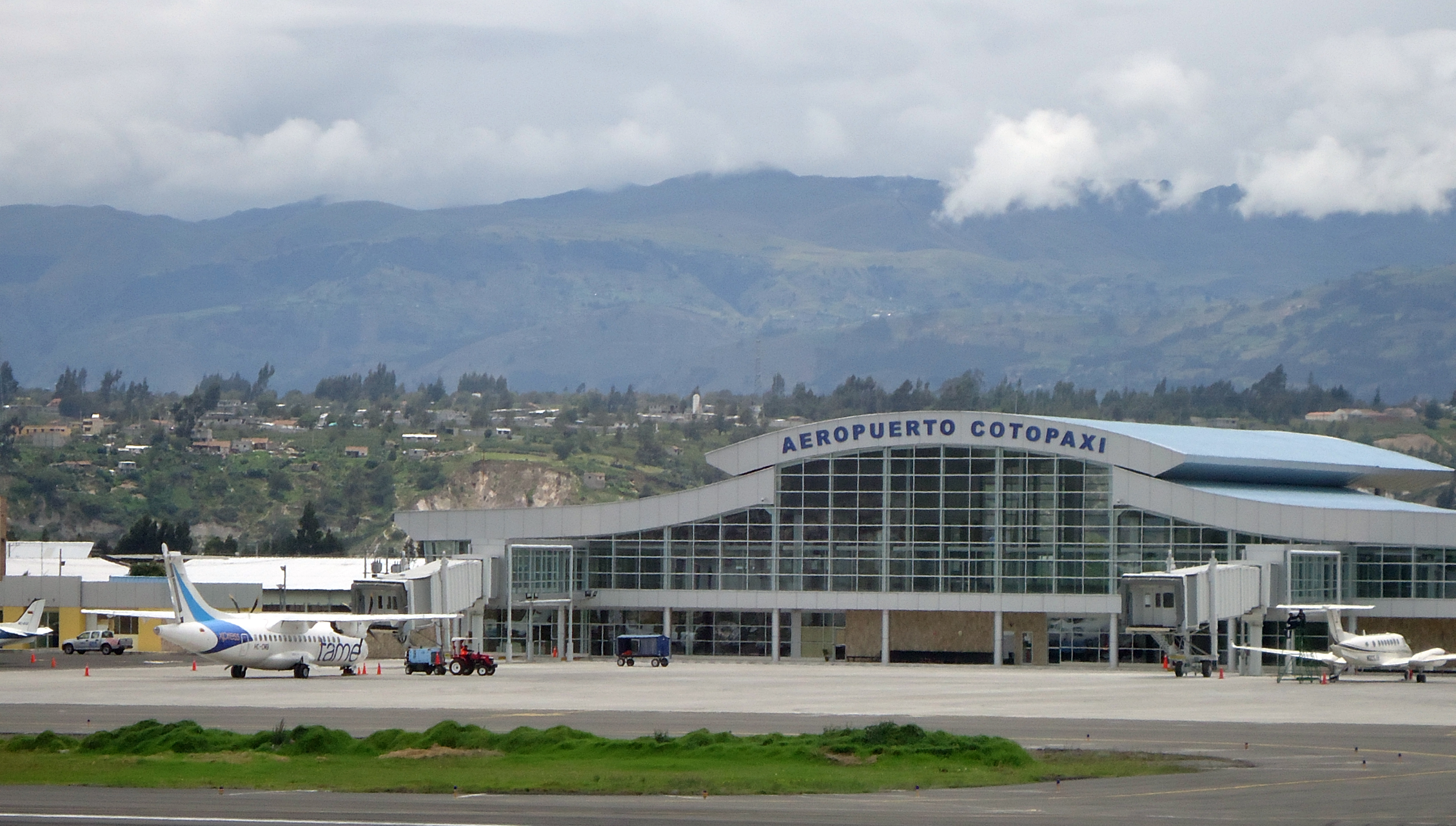
- IATA: LTX; ICAO: SELT

Summary
- Airport type: Public and Military
- Operator: Ecuadorian Air Force
- Serves: Latacunga, Ecuador
- Elevation AMSL: 9,480 ft (2,890 m)
- Coordinates: 00°54′25″S 78°36′57″W

Map
- Location of the airport in Ecuador

Runways
Direction	Length		Surface
Direction	m	ft	Surface
01/19	3,712	12,178	Asphalt
- Source: WAD GCM

Cotopaxi International Airport (Spanish: Aeropuerto Internacional Cotopaxi) (IATA: LTX, ICAO: SELT) is a high-elevation airport in Latacunga, the capital of the Cotopaxi Province in Ecuador. The airport is within a broad valley of the Ecuadoran Andes, with rising terrain east and west, and mountainous terrain distant in all quadrants.

It has the second longest runway in Ecuador. Runway length includes a 440 metres (1,440 ft) displaced threshold on Runway 19.

== Airlines and destinations ==
=== Cargo ===
Airlines	Destinations
Cargolux	Bogotá, Luxembourg

Cargo B airlines once operated to the airport with Boeing 747 freighter airplanes, making it the largest airplane to operate at this airport. Cargolux currently operates the type to Europe from Cotopaxi.

== See also ==
- Transport in Ecuador
- List of airports in Ecuador
