= Sterrebeek =

Coordinates: 50.861701°N 4.512677°E

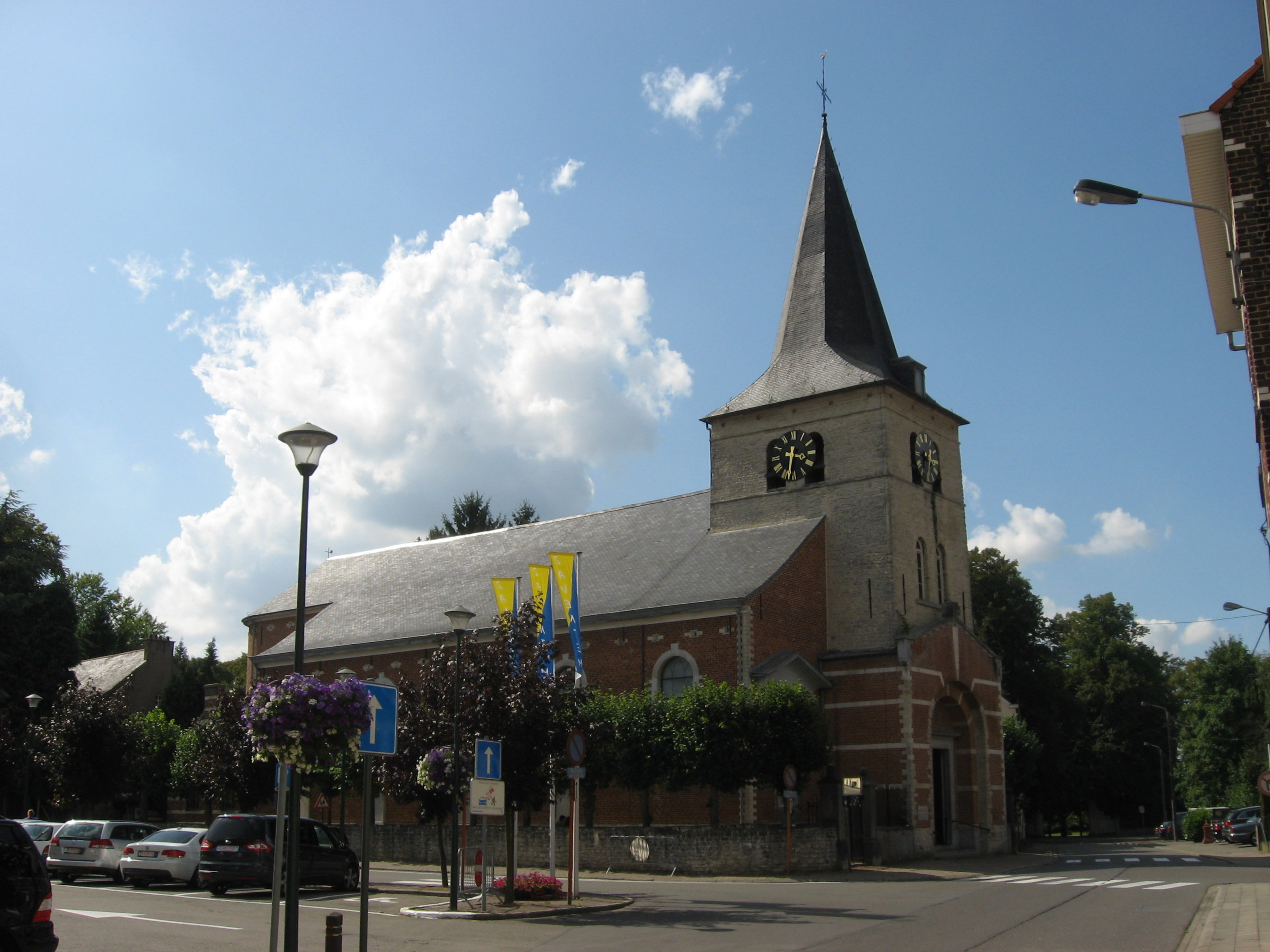
The parish church of Saint Pancratius in Sterrebeek

Sterrebeek is a town in the municipality (gemeente) of Zaventem, and a suburb on the east-northeast side of Brussels.

Brussels American School (the United States Department of Defense Education Activity school) is located in Sterrebeek.

The official language is Dutch (as everywhere in Flanders).

== See also ==
- Lord of Saventhem and Sterrebeke
