= Nossegem =

Coordinates: 50°53′N 4°30′E

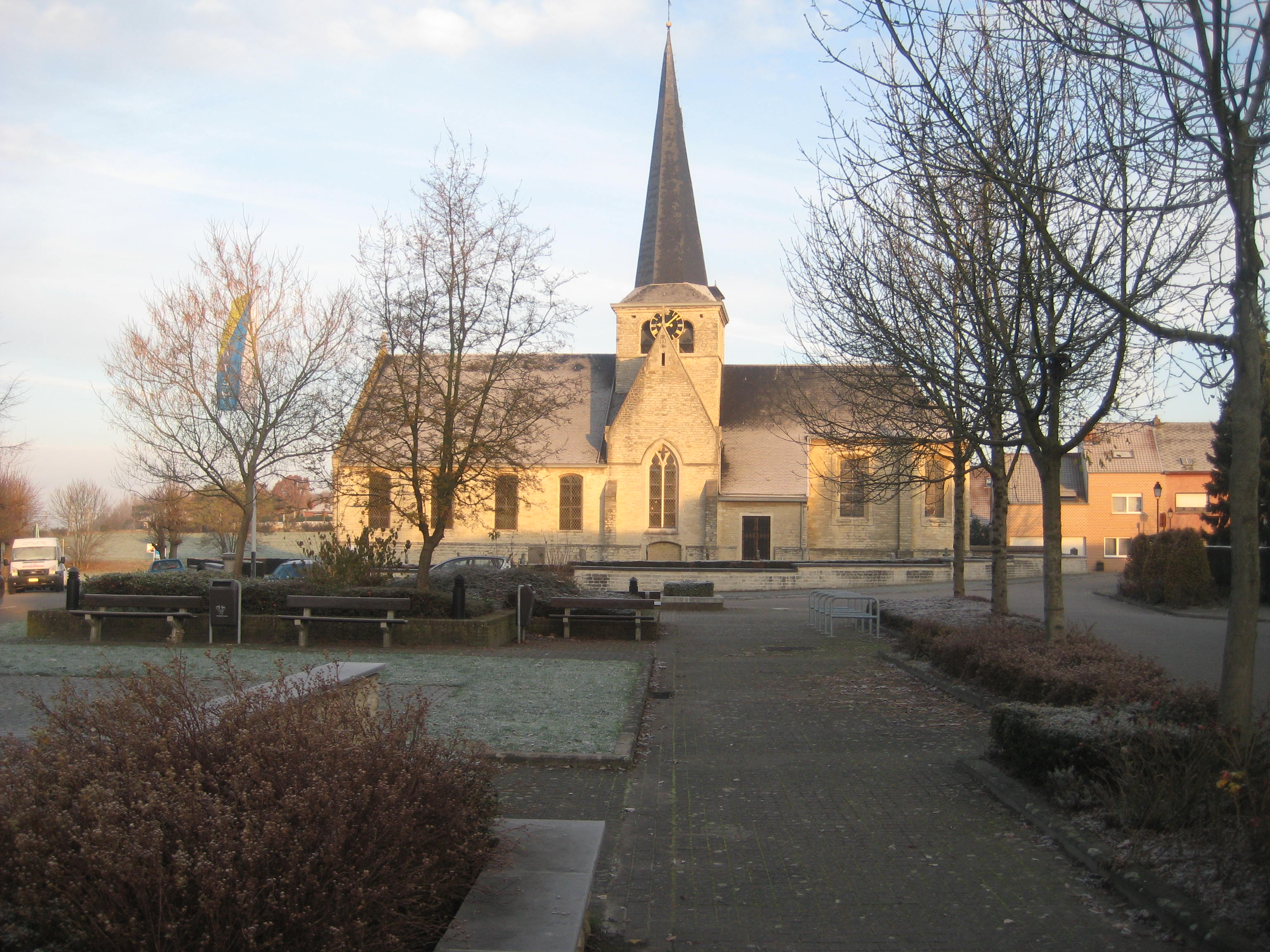
Church of Nossegem, Belgium

Nossegem is a town located near Brussels, the capital of Belgium. It is part of Zaventem municipality, in the Flemish Brabant province.

In 2005, the Nossegem Curve was opened, which connects Brussels Airport with the railway in the direction of Leuven.
